Women of Wrestling aka WOW!, is a women's professional wrestling promotion founded in 2000 by David McLane, previously the founder of Gorgeous Ladies of Wrestling. It is based in Los Angeles, California, and is owned by McLane and Los Angeles Lakers owner and president Jeanie Buss. The promotion's eponymous program has aired in nine "seasons" since 2000.

WOW (season 1)

WOW Superheroes (2000–2001)

Beckie "The Farmer's Daughter" (Renee Madison Cole): Farm girl from the fictitious Hog Hollow, Nebraska. Tag team partner of Bronco Billie. Feuded with Jungle Grrrl over the Splash move. Beckie is from Hog Hollow, Nebraska. She can bale hay and drive a tractor, and learned how to wrestle by scufflin' with hogs. The Farmer's Daughter has just moved to the big city and everything is still really new. She promised the folks back home she'll live by the Golden Rule - "Do unto others…" and promises her opponents if they try to hurt her, she'll stomp them like mud on a pig. Used a move called The Farmer's Roll(450 splash). Feuded with Jungle Grrrl over the splash move.                                                                                                                                                       
Boom Boom (Patty Bunya-Ananta): Island girl from Hawaii. Tag team partner of Caliente. Known for the Boom Boom Squash. The ground shakes when she walks, and children beam when she smiles. Boom Boom is naturally as sunny and warm as the Hawaiian Islands, but does her harm or injure one of her friends, and the Volcano will erupt. She is fiercely protective of the underdog and will go to the wall for her buddies. Get her angry and she'll lower the Boom Boom on you. 
Bronco Billie (Lisa Danielle Rachuba): Cowgirl who owned a ranch in Texas. Tag team partner of Beckie the Farmer's Daughter. Finished off her opponents with the Bulldog. Had a feud with the Disciplinarian over her ranch. From the Wild West, Bronco Billie is a cowgirl at heart. She loves to ride and rope, and plans on using her skills to hog-tie her opponents in the ring. When not working out, she spends every weekend on her ranch with her horses. Watch out when this filly gets riled, she's been known to brand her foes after a victory with her signature double B. Finished off her opponents with the Bulldog. Had a feud with the Disciplinarian over the ownership of her ranch.
Caliente (Rachel Iverson): Fiery Latina wrestler, known for her submission move, the Mexican Surfboard. Tag team partner of Boom Boom. Caliente is a fiery competitor. She considers herself a Latina superwoman and really turns on the heat in the ring. She deflects stereotypes by proving a woman with strength of character can break down any barrier. She carries her heritage with pride. A lover of salsa dancing, Caliente plans on defeating opponents with a Latin beat.
Charlie Davidson: Biker, with a bad attitude. One half of Harley's Angels. Lost to their sworn enemies, Caged Heat for the Tag Team titles. A member of the team Harley's Angels and part of Thug's gang, this biker has a wild side. Charlie will do and try anything once and can be reckless in the ring. She goes at it full throttle and is always ready for a fight. Charlie is devoted to her gang and everyone else can take a hike. Part of Harley's Angels together with EZ Rider and Thug.
Christy Order: One half of Law and Order. Tag team partner of Nicki Law. A rogue police officer. Christy did not wrestle before WOW went dormant.
Danger (Elle Alexander): Billed as the Weapons master. Had a tendency to use her finishing move, the Danger Drop, on referees and was constantly suspended. Defeated Terri Gold for the title, and lost it soon after at the Pay-Per-View event. Known for her feud with Riot, her erstwhile tag team partner. A weapons master of the first degree, Danger handles firearms, bullwhips, and broadswords with deadly accuracy. Tired of target practice, she has invaded WOW with her eyes on human prey. Cold and calculating, she yearns for the chase, the capture, and moving in for the kill. Each opponent is another wall trophy for her, and every victory is another notch on her gun belt. Had a tendency to use her finishing move, the Danger Drop (Side Slam), on referees and was constantly suspended. Defeated Terri Gold for the title and lost it soon after at the pay-per-view event. Known for her feud with her former tag-team partner, Riot.
Delta Lotta Pain (Jwaundace Candece): Prisoner from the Nevada State Penitentiary, billed with Loca and Vendetta as Caged Heat. She, along with Loca, returned to the promotion in 2013. Out on work release, or maybe prison break, Delta is part of the tag team Caged Heat with her partner in crime Loca. A violent criminal, she is proud to be the toughest inmate in her cellblock. Aggressive and at times brutal, Delta loves to put the hurt on her opponents and must be taken away in handcuffs. Facing her can be hazardous to your health. Former WOW World Tag Team Championship holder.
The Disciplinarian (Kristen Davidson): Heel School Administrator, billed as being from the Board of Education. Had a large fan base, in spite of her being a heel. Called Ms. D. by her fans. Known for her finishing move, the "Final Exam". Feuded with Bronco Billie, when the cowgirl discovered that her ranch was purchased by the Disciplinarian. From the Board of Education, she comes to WOW determined to teach her foes a lesson. Upset with the lack of strict behavior codes in schools, the Disciplinarian plans on making an example of the competition in the ring. She demands respect, and those who oppose her may find their wrists slapped with a yardstick, or their mouths washed out with soap. She can't wait to send someone to detention.
EZ Rider (Eleanor Kerrigan): Biker girl also with a bad attitude, one half of Harley's Angels. Lost the Tag Team title match to their sworn enemies, Caged Heat. A member of Harley's Angels with Charlie Davidson and part of Thug's gang, E.Z is tough and dependable. She always has your back in a fight. Not as reckless as Charlie Davidson, she can look as serious as a heart attack, and dish out a serious beating. She keeps her emotions in check so she can concentrate on inflicting pain. Part of Harley's Angels together with Charlie Davidson and Thug. Known for her fantastic mike skills (as her portrayer was a stand-up comedienne), EZ would later rejoin the promotion, but not as a wrestler, but as the new commentator.
Farah "The Persian Princess" (Telma  Roshanravan): Iranian wrestler, known for her exotic dancing. Tag team partner of Paradise. Exotic and enchanting, this Persian import is a genie in a bottle. No one knows what mystic wonders lay behind her entrancing eyes. Farrah moves like a cat, stalking her opponent, and then striking. She uses her almost hypnotic belly dancing undulations to catch foes off guard, leaving them spellbound. Her magical aura adds more spice to her Middle Eastern flavour.                                                                                      
"Hammerin'" Heather Steele (Christina Tomaziesski Colby): Billed as Everyone's favourite Tool Time Girl, known for her ability to build and maintain houses, and her ability to fix anything. Had a loyal fan base, despite having only one win. Hammerin' Heather Steele has all the tools to nail her opponents to the mat. Originally from Sweet Home, Oregon, Heather is a buzz saw in the ring. She's skillful enough with her hands to build a house or tear down her foe. When the fans see Heather, they raise the roof.
Ice Cold (Inga Waggoner): Arctic themed loner. Didn't really trust anyone. A Nordic beauty whose cold demeanour intimidates opponents, she goes about attacking her foes while always keeping her cool. Her eyes show she is unfeeling with a cruel streak. At home in icy climates, she knows no warmth, and displays none. Her penetrating stare sends shivers down opponents' spines. Even partners can expect the cold shoulder from her. She can't wait to put the competition in the deep freeze. Known for her finishing move, the Ice Pick (diving elbow drop). Erstwhile tag team partner of Poison. Known for her feud with Lana Star (whom she used her own mirror smashing tactic against), who shaved her hair at the pay-per-view event.
Jacklyn Hyde (Vasilika Vanya Marinkovic): Split personality wrestler who escaped her mental health unit, can be nice one minute, manic the next. Usually carries her favourite dolly to the ring and is often escorted by either her psychiatrist, Dra. Sarah Bellum, or her unit nurse, Nurse Mercy. A violent split personality who wrestles with herself as much as her opponents. The battle between good and evil within her is etched on her face. She is a frightening foe who can go berserk without warning, unleashing a furious assault and then becoming harmless as a kitten. To say she's unbalanced is an understatement. Known for her finishing move the Jacklyn Splitter (running neckbreaker).
Jade (Jennifer Lee Chan): Chinese wrestler known for her "Samurai Scissors" move. Has a fan in her beloved grandmother. One half of the Asian Invasion. Though small in stature, this Chinese spitfire is huge in heart. Proud of her heritage, Jade is devoted to her grandmother and benefits from her teachings. She may be overmatched but she never backs down from a challenge. Despite great obstacles, she continues on. Her struggle mirrors that of Asians who came to America and strived and toiled for success and refused to give up until their goal was reached. She teams with Lotus in The Asian Invasion, bringing a vital import to WOW. (sometimes called the Jaded Edge, which is a diving hurricanrana). Has a fan in her late beloved grandmother. She returned to the promotion in 2013.
Jane Blond (Ella Carter): UK wrestler based on the James Bond secret agent theme. Known for the "Kick of Death", her Missile Dropkick finishing move. As a young girl, this Brit dreamed of becoming a spy and she's gone a long way toward reaching that goal. Both her parents were foreign born and Jane is a native of England, touring as a dancer and developing a talent for martial arts. Her world travel helped wet her appetite for intrigue. Her Aunt is the current Sheriff of Nottingham and her sister worked for Scotland Yard. It is no wonder then that Jane became a member of Her Majesty's Secret Service. She lives for action and sees WOW as her latest mission.                                                                                     
Jungle Grrrl (Erica Porter): Tarzan based wrestler, billed as from being from the Amazon Rainforest. One of the few near undefeated wrestlers in WOW (the other one being Slam Dunk). Known for her finishing move, the diving splash, and for her feud with Beckie "The Farmer's Daughter" over who had the best splash. She returned to the promotion in 2013.
Lana Star (Lana Kinnear): One of WOW's marquee performers. Often called the Fabulous Lana Star. A movie star wannabe who often used dirty tricks and cheating such as smashing hand mirrors (Ice Cold returned the favor against her with the same tactic) and spraying hair spray in her opponent's eyes to win her matches. Known for her finishing move, the Lana Star Facelift. Arrogantly called Women of Wrestling, "the Lana Star Show". A former tag team partner of Poison, who was her personal assistant before she fired her. Had Patti Pizzazz, formerly Patti Pep, as her new personal assistant until she fired her as well. Known primarily for her diva-like behavior and her feuds with Poison, Ice Cold and Randi Rah Rah. She returned to the promotion in 2013. Former WOW World Championship holder.
Loca (Cher Ferreyra): Prisoner from Nevada State Penitentiary. One third of Caged Heat, along with Delta Lotta Pain and Vendetta, Tag Team Champions. This wild Latina goes out of her way to live up to her name. She's tough and loves a good fight. If there isn't one scheduled, she'll start one. Such behaviour helped land her a stay at a state penitentiary. It was there that she met Delta Lotta Pain and decided to form the tag team Caged Heat. When she goes off on a tear, she will rant in Spanish attempting to intimidate her opponent, as if this tattooed brawler isn't frightening enough. She's living la Vida Loca. She, along with Delta Lotta Pain, returned to the promotion in 2013. Former WOW World Tag Team Championship holder.
Lotus (Jeannie Kim): Korean wrestler who is one half of the Asian Invasion. Tired of Asian stereotypes, this exotic flower decided to take matters in her own hands, and make her statement - "We're strong and we belong." This proud Korean carries her heritage with her, embracing its spirituality; Lotus takes a backseat to no one in the ring. She teams with Jade to form the tag team The Asian Invasion, giving fans a small taste of the Orient. Watch this Lotus bloom in the ring.
Misery (Kristen Davidson): Hooded wrestler. One half of The Daughters of Darkness along with Mystery, managed by the mysterious Goon.
Mystery (Nicole Ochoa): Hooded wrestler. One half of The Daughters of Darkness along with Misery, managed by the mysterious Goon. Tried to mug Terri Gold and steal her title belt, but was defeated by her in the ring.
Nicki Law: Rogue police officer. One half of Law and Order along with Christy Order. She wrestled at the pay-per-view event before WOW went dormant. Known for finishing move, the neckbreaker.
Paradise (Maria Nunez): Island Girl wrestler from Tonga. Tag Team Partner of Farah The Persian Princess. Her name is whispered in the wind. From the Polynesian Islands, Paradise brings her culture to WOW. This native of Tonga is as exotic as her tropical home. Very family oriented, she wears traditional garb to the ring in tribute to her people. As friendly and colourful as the islands, she is strong in heart and wants to make her people proud. She returned to the promotion in 2013.                                                                                     
Patti Pizzazz: Cheerleader corrupted by Lana Star into becoming her Personal Assistant. She was eventually fired by Lana due to her residual friendship with Randi Rah Rah, whom she remained friends with, despite her heel turn. Formerly Tandem Team Spirit and Tag team partner of Randi Rah Rah. After receiving national recognition as a cheerleader and a Ms. Fitness Regional Champion, Patti brings all her energy to the ring. Her agility, gymnastic ability and quickness make her a force to be reckoned with - exciting to watch, explosive when opposed. She partners with fellow cheerleader Randi Rah-Rah to form Team Spirit, a high flying tandem that gets three cheers from the fans.
Phantom (Lynnette Thredgold): Wrestler who was torn between being a bodybuilder/wrestler and a concert violinist. Known for the Sharpshooter leg lock. She left after Wendi Wheels broke her jaw with her Blowout finishing move.
Poison (Kina Van Vleet): One of the best performers on the show with large fan base. A lab worker who was a crack chemist. She ingested poison and changed her personality. Tag Team partner with Ice Cold. Known for her vicious attacks, the camel clutch which she used to soften her opponents up for her inverted DDT (called the Poison Paralyzer) and feud with Lana Star, whose hair she turned green.                                                                                                                                                   
Randi Rah Rah: Cheerleader, friend of Patti Pep (and later Patti Pizzazz). Despite Patti's heel turn, Randi was still friends with her. Taken out of wrestling after Lana Star smashed a mirror over her head, only to come back later in the series run to decisively defeat her (and to re-establish her friendship with Patti Pizzazz). Formerly Tandem Team Spirit and Tag team partner of Patti Pep. Exciting to watch, and full of energy, this highflying athlete cartwheels into WOW. A professional cheerleader for the NFL's Memphis Oilers, Randi uses her agility to subdue opponents. A sparkplug in the ring, she joins forces with Patti Pep to form the tandem Team Spirit and the fans really flip for them.
Riot (April Kathryn Littlejohn): Another of the marquee performers of WOW. Billed as being from the mean streets of Chicago. Master of the Powerbomb. A loner with a rebellious nature. A fan of Heavy Metal, Riot lives that lifestyle in and out of the ring. She loves to put the hurt on her opponent and doesn't care if it's in a match or in the parking lot afterward. She's hard living, hard hitting, and relaxes by smashing windshields with a baseball bat. Riot is out of control, Despite being a heel (later becoming a 'tweener'), she had one of the larger fan bases in WOW. Known for her feud with Danger, her former tag team partner. Riot returned to the federation in 2016.
Roxy Powers (Natalie T. Yeo): Billed as the Total Athlete. Known for her feud with Slam Dunk later in the series run. Tag team partner of Tanja the Warrior Woman. Roxy is the total athlete. She excels in kickboxing, rope jumping, Tae Kwon Do, weight training, boxing and cross-training. She runs, bikes, and roller blades. Always hungry for new physical challenges, Roxy has come to WOW to take on the best and become the best. Confident in her abilities and proud of her achievements, Roxy will no doubt rise to the top with the Powers power. 
Sandy (Tamie Sheffield): Lifeguard, One half of the Beach Patrol, Tag Team partner with Summer replaced Sunny in the Beach Patrol, when the later became Wendi Wheels. A true California girl who is full of sun and fun. She stays in shape swimming, rollerblading, and running on the beach. Sandy joined her partner Sunny who later became Wendi Wheels. And The new member Summer to form the tag team Beach Patrol. They keep beach goers safe, but have other plans for their foes. When fans see Sandy, they get caught up in a wave of excitement.
Selina Majors: "The Real Deal", known for her battles with Thug. Used the Stunner to defeat her opponents. Was rescued by Caged Heat after brutalization by Harley's Angels. A star athlete and accomplished businesswoman, Selina Majors has conquered both the wrestling and the business worlds. Her fifteen years in wrestling have netted her worldwide recognition, and her vast skills have enabled her to become world champion four times. After saving her wrestling earnings, Selina purchased a chicken farm in Georgia. Her business skills turned the farm into a primary supplier for major fast food chains and provided Selina the means to continue pursuing her wrestling dreams. Selina comes to WOW to prove that women can be successful in many roles. She returned to the promotion in 2013.
Slam Dunk (Famisha Jones-Millman): Female basketball player supposedly banned from the WNBA due to her overly aggressive nature. She, along with Jungle Grrrl, was two of the near undefeated wrestlers in Women of Wrestling. Known for her arrogance and bad attitude. Best known for her feud with Roxy Powers later in the show's run. Despite her heel status, she had a very large fan base. At 6'3'', ranked #3 in rebounding in college and defensive player of the year, she had few peers in basketball, but when she was turned down by the WNBA, Slam Dunk decided to take her rough style of play to the mat. This power forward has turned her physical game up a notch, and plans on using her height advantage to bully smaller foes. A natural athlete with great leaping ability, this female Michael Jordan now claims the ring as her home court. 
Summer (Bobbi Billard): Lifeguard, like Sandy. One half of the Beach Patrol along with Sandy. Summer replaced Sunny of the Beach Patrol, when the latter became Wendi Wheels. Living on the beaches of sunny Southern California, Summer was a natural choice for the Beach Patrol. This blonde beauty recognized her athletic abilities and sense of teamwork would allow her to patrol the WOW ring with her partner Sandy. At home in the water, Summer is always ready to come to the aid of anyone in need. 
Tanja "The Warrior Woman" (Tanja Richter): Warrior wrestler in the vein of Xena: Warrior Princess. Known for her spinning wheel kick finisher. Tag team partner of Roxy Powers. Bred for battle and schooled in the art of defense, this female hero brings all her skills to WOW. A rugged competitor, she never runs from a fight. Highly trained in weaponry, her broadsword is her best friend, but she would rather vanquish her foes with her bare hands. In search of adventure, she plans on conquering WOW.                                                                                                                                                                                                                                                                      
Terri Gold (Heather Lee-Millard): The first WOW World Champion. Gymnast, known for her moons Ault, The Perfect 10. Lost her title belt to Danger; but gained it back not long after at the Pay-Per-View, thanks to some unintentional help from Riot. In 2002, she was defeated in a WOW-sanctioned match, losing the title to the Fabulous Lana Star.  Terri Gold once competed on the gymnastic floor, but now she competes in the WOW ring. Her commitment to training and conditioning have led her to numerous Ms’ Fitness Championships and resulted in her receiving the coveted Image Of Fitness Award. Proving that good things come in small packages, Terri uses a vast array of gymnastic manoeuvres to cut her opponents down to size. Every move of Terri's is a perfect "10.
Thug (Peggy Lee Leather): Bad tempered biker, leader of Harley's Angels. Known for her long running feud with Selina Majors (from their days in POWW) and for her continual interference in Harley's Angels' matches. Her "niece" Spike, is a current WOW girl. A motorcycle gang leader who's as tough as an old piece of leather. She was raised in a pool hall and wouldn't hesitate to whack you with a cue stick and take your money. She's mean and hard with no respect for authority. She taunts opponents, warning them, "You'd rather kiss a rattle snake than wrestle me." She does what she wants because she can. She returned to the promotion in 2013.
Vendetta (Nicole Ochoa): Prisoner from the Nevada State Penitentiary, known for being one third of Caged Heat, helped her cell mates even the odds at the Pay-Per-View by slamming Thug in the centred of the ring, after her interfering in their title match. She did not return to the promotion in 2013, when Caged Heat (Delta Lotta Pain and Loca) returned.
Wendi Wheels (Rebecca Gravell): Female Mechanic can fix up cars and can tear down opponents with the Blowout (sitdown facebuster). Originally known as Sunny of the Beach Patrol along with Sandy in the first episode, she became Wendi Wheels and stayed with that role to the series end. At home in the ring or under the hood of a car, Wendi races to WOW ready for action. With the ability to wrestle scientifically or brawl with the best of them, she can take apart her opponent as easily as she dismantles an engine. A mechanic in the ring, Wendi delivers high speed thrills when she gets revved up.

WOW Tag Teams (season 1)

The remaining teams were mainly created for WOW's Tag Team Tournament, although some of the teams continued to team with one another until the end of the first season.

The official teams
The Asian Invasion: Jade and Lotus
The Beach Patrol: Sandy and Summer
Beckie the Farmers Daughter and Bronco Billie
Boom Boom and Caliente
Caged Heat: Delta Lotta Pain and Loca with Vendetta. Defeated Harley's Angels for the titles. At first, a heel tag team, they became tweeners after they saved Selina Majors from one of Harley's Angels brutalization. Known for their finishing moves, the Drive By and Capital Punishment.
The Daughters of Darkness: Misery and Mystery, Managed by a mysterious man called The Goon.
Farah the Persian Princess and Paradise
Harley's Angels: Charlie Davidson and EZ Rider with Thug. Known for their constant three on one interference and their frequent assaults on Selina Majors. Defeated by Caged Heat for the titles. Became enemies of Caged Heat after Delta and Loca saved Selina Majors from one of the biker team's assaults.
Ice Cold and Poison
Lana Star and Patti Pizzazz (formerly known as Patti Pep)
Law and Order: Christy Order and Nicki Law
Roxy Powers and Tanja the Warrior Woman
The former teams
The Beach Patrol: Sandy and Sunny (later Wendi Wheels)
Danger and Riot
The Team Spirit: Patti Pep (later Patti Pizzazz) and Randi Rah Rah
The unofficial teams
Beckie the Farmers Daughter, Bronco Billie and Terri Gold

List of episodes (season 1) 2000–2001

The series is taped aired on Broadcast syndication and lately streaming aired on the social media account YouTube channel.

Below are the results of the matches aired on the WOW TV show and the approximate dates they aired.

WOW (season 2–4)

WOW Superheroes (2013-2016)

Abilene Maverick "The Governor's Daughter" (Callee Wilkerson): New generation WOW Superhero the promotion in 2013. The stars at night are big and bright deep in the heart of Texas! Day or night, though, no lone star shines brighter than Miss Abilene Maverick. College Station, Texas—the home of Texas A&M University and the Aggies—is where this beautiful lady calls home, and what a fitting home it is. This competitor strives to personify the Texas fighting spirit every time she laces up her boots, steps between those ropes, and locks horns with her opponents. Born in Caldwell, Texas, Abilene always had a love for the adventures of the outdoors and the wide world of sports. She is a self-confessed tomboy, and says some of her greatest childhood memories come from running barefoot across luscious Texas pastures. Her first taste of competition came from playing softball as a youth—a sport she played for eleven years. After excelling in athletics for so many years, she gravitated towards the world of dance. She was inspired to dance by her father, who was quite a dancer in his own right. You may say that the dancing fever was in her blood. Outside of the ring, Abilene is a proponent for healthy living. She eats all-natural food. Gives food scraps to animals around her neighbourhood. She also creates her own compost for her yard.  And after the sudden loss of her father in 2009 due to sudden cardiac failure, she has become a much greater advocate for people looking to quit smoking. This good ol’ girl from Texas is working to promote healthy living for herself, her family, and her fans. Being a natural born competitor with grace, humility, and a strong moral compass, many calling Abilene Maverick a strong role model for women—and men—all over the world. Of course, if you told her this, she’d just say, “Y’all can just call me Abby. Tag team partner of Candace LeRae.
Azúcar (Vanessa Herrera): New generation WOW Superhero the promotion in 2013. Born and raised in Mexico’s capital city with wrestling in her backyard, Azucar quickly discovered that wrestling was her destiny. As a young girl, Azucar’s mother nurtured her interest and intrigue in the sport by taking her to the local arena to watch AAA professional wrestling. There, Azucar was witness to the great battles of such stars as El Santo, Dr. Wagner, and Blue Demon. After witnessing these legends in action, Azucar’s interest and intrigue became a passion for Lucha Libre, Mexico’s native term for professional wrestling. Azucar says she gravitated towards the athleticism, the finesse of the fighters, but mostly, she was drawn to the tradition of the mask. The lucha libre mask, a cultural icon throughout the entire world, signifies greatness, heritage, tradition, and respect. It is a symbol of honor, much like the suits of armor that knights would wear into battle when they fought for castles and kings. Azucar, as a girl, saw what it means when a wrestler would lose their mask. They were shamed. They were humiliated. They were stripped of everything that made them a proud fighter. She grew up wanting, needing, and hoping to one day represent those same values and virtues. She had also noticed that there were no women wrestling. She began thinking, “Why aren’t there any female warriors donning the mask?” She also thought, “I am fully capable of doing something like that. I can get in that ring and prove that I belong!” Azucar took the principles instilled in her by her mother and the lucha libre legends she revered, and set out on her own path first training in the art of MMA fighting, and then joining the WOW – Women Of Wrestling. Azucar was met with a mixed reaction from her colleagues when she entered WOW training wearing a famed lucha libre mask. The ignorance of her fellow wrestlers resulted in Azucar nearly being ostracized for being different. Although, once the others caught a glimpse of Azucar’s passion and athletic prowess, they quickly realized what Azucar stood for and represented. After getting to know her on a personal level, they also saw that she and the mask were one. They stood for the same ideas for which Azucar wished to become a beacon. Now that Azucar’s lifelong dream has become a reality, she must fight to ensure that she never suffers the same loss and humiliation that her idols felt when they lost their mask. For that mask and its tradition mean the world to Azucar, and she will stop at nothing to prove that she and the mask are one in the same. They stand for the proud heritage of the Mexican people and all of Lucha Libre.
The Beverly Hills Babe (Amber O'Neal): Formerly Amber O'Neal, New generation WOW Superhero the promotion in 2013. is a motorcycle-riding, party-pumping, hell-raising Southern girl hailing from the Queen City of Charlotte, North Carolina. She is a veteran of the ring, and that translates to Amber having seen it all inside and outside of the ring. Having known she wanted to become a professional wrestler since she first saw women wrestling on television, Amber has clawed, scratched, and persevered through years of traveling the East coast in lonely car rides and battling a long list of opponents that have stepped up to her. Amber has managed to overcome all the obstacles of the professional wrestling business. Her passion for wrestling started at a young age and began to flourish from there. She absorbed all the knowledge she could possibly encounter, and set out to transform the sport of wrestling. She began training in the late-90s, and quickly proved to be a student of the game. She took the knowledge bestowed upon her by her many great trainers and incorporated her own flavor to them. Amber O’Neal is able take any wrestling maneuver and turn into a dazzling spectacle of fun while simultaneously dishing out a world of punishment to her opponents. She is a true visionary and innovator. Now, after her years of innovating offense, strategically decimating her opponents, and accruing numerous wins, Amber O’Neal is armed with years of knowledge, and is prepared to share that knowledge with any fortunate young star looking to benefit from a true ring veteran. When not teaching lessons in how to kick butt, Amber enjoys riding any one of her fabulous motorcycles she’s collected over the years. Her thrill-seeking, adventure-loving nature is present in the ring too as seen when she pulls out her fantastic dance moves, electric smile, and unorthodox offense. Amber O’Neal’s mind and body are her greatest weapons, and she uses them to dismantle and break down her opponents. She is a technician and a scholar, but also one of the most entertaining individuals to ever set foot inside a wrestling ring. Amber O’Neal is a true veteran, but her greatest years are ahead of her, especially now that she finds herself in WOW - Women of Wrestling, the proving ground for the greatest women wrestlers in the world. Amber’s fun-loving style will prove difficult for many opponents to overcome, and her years of experience will prove useful to any future star looking to soak up any tips they can from one of the most knowledgeable, intelligent ring warriors WOW has to offer. Watch out, there’s a blonde bombshell getting ready to drop on all of WOW!. One half of the All American Girls along with Santana Garrett, new WOW World Tag Team Championship holders in 2013 by defeating Caged Heat. Turned on her partner, Santana Garrett, by Lana Star and is now christened the Beverly Hills Babe.                                                                                                                                  
Caged Heat:  Delta Lotta Pain (Jwaundace Candece) and Loca (Cher Ferreyra): Original WOW Superhero, She returned to the promotion in 2013. As the WOW World Tag Team Championship holder. " THE POT STIRRERS" Whether they are playing dirty or keeping it clean, Loca and Delta Lotta Pain hold the title of most famed and controversial tag team in WOW. Caged Heat rose to fame in WOW when the Nevada State Penitentiary granted them a “fight release program” as an outlet for their aggression—better they fight in the ring than in the yard. While Loca and Delta will be the first to admit they like to start trouble, that's not against the law. For over a decade, the two proclaimed their innocence, arguing that they were wrongfully convicted of crimes they did not commit. They're grateful that attorney Sophia Lopez was able to overturn their sentence, but her behavior in handling Season 3's tag team title controversy raised some red flags. During a comeback that was supposed to be all about second chances, Sophia Lopez encouraged them to literally steal the titles. While Loca and Delta wear their orange jumpsuits in solidarity with their former inmates, Sophia's statements only cast more doubt on their rehabilitation. But one thing hasn't changed about Caged Heat—they love to commit LEGAL assault. They love it so much that they are dead set on not getting disqualified from earning back those tag team championship belts and cementing their legacy once and for all. Case closed. They return 
Candice LeRae (Candice Dawson): New WOW Superhero the promotion in 2013. The Great White North has yielded many impressive exports, but none more impressive than Candice LeRae. Born in Winnipeg, Manitoba, Candice hails from a country where wrestling is a national past-time. Great names like the Hart Family, Chris Jericho, and Lance Storm all called Canada home. Candice joins those fellow greats in preserving the Canadian heritage of phenomenal wrestling technicians. After seeing the influence of the many great Canadian professional wrestlers, Candice became infatuated with the sport. She decided to pursue a career in the awe-inspiring world of wrestling. Her quest to gain the knowledge she so desperately sought took her to California where she absorbed every piece of information she could possibly find. Candice LeRae finally made her debut in 2002, and quickly established a name for her. Now, Candice LeRae stands out as one of the premiere names in the Golden State, and now seeks to make her name on the big time as she joins the WOW Women of Wrestling organization. When not in the ring, Candice is a renaissance woman in her own right, and finds many interests outside of wrestling that keep her busy and satisfied. Candice is quite the culinary aficionado, and spends a great deal of time cooking a vast assortment of meals and dishes. For additional fun, she frequently visits Disneyland, is an avid fan of the Anaheim Ducks, and loves reading comic books. This multi-faceted Superhero has made quite a name for her on the independent circuit, and continues to be one of the hottest rising stars in wrestling today. Candice’s presence in WOW certainly shakes things up quite a bit. Thus making Candice LeRae somewhat of a wild-card. Keep your eyes out for Canada’s own, Candice LeRae, WOW’s newest international sensation!. Tag team partner of Abilene Maverick "The Governor's Daughter".
The Dagger: New generation WOW Superhero the promotion in 2016.
Delta Lotta Pain (Jwaundace Candece): Original WOW Superhero, She returned to the promotion in 2013. Prisoner from the Nevada State Penitentiary, billed with Loca and Vendetta as Caged Heat. She, along with Loca (sans Vendetta), returned to the promotion in 2013. Former WOW World Tag Team Championship holder. What time is it? Hard times! That’s right, the most unforgettable tag team in WOW history has returned with a vengeance. Loca and Delta Lotta Pain, together hailed as Caged Heat--the former Tag Team Champions of WOW--have forged their reputation for being the baddest duo on the planet. Delta Lotta Pain is the enforcer of the group with a nasty temper and the ferocity in the ring to match. Her only ally in life is her fellow inmate and tag team partner, Loca. Together, they decimated opponents using their hardcore, prison tactics. Their smash-mouth style left their competition in a wake of devastation. Many opponents were unprepared for the unorthodox style of two of WOW’s most tenured competitors. Loca and Delta Lotta Pain have gone on to employ the services of Sophia Lopez, a unique public defender with a track record for getting long-time inmates out of prison. With Ms. Lopez’ helps, Caged Heat can now call themselves FORMER residents of the Nevada State Correctional Facility. Now on parole, there is no telling where Loca and Delta Lotta Pain will take their bad attitudes. With a new crop of talent to be fed to the greatest tag team in WOW history, Caged Heat are salivating at the chance to prove their continued dominance against some of the new blood and Delta Lotta Pain will as always be the enforcer of Caged Heat’s pain.
Desdemeana "The Soldier Of Darkness" (Andrea VanEpps): New generation WOW Superhero the promotion in 2013. She hails from the Darkest Regions on the Planet. She stalks her opponents like a predator eyeing its prey. She is WOW’s most ominous presence. She is the mystifying and terrifying Desdemeana. They call her the Soldier of Darkness—a title that most aptly describes her. The intimidating, black wardrobe. The intriguing war paint. The malicious in-ring style of wrestling. It is all a composition. A black symphony, if you will. Desdemeana enjoys and relegates in the darkness. She relishes in the macabre. She takes pleasure in the bleakest aspects of human existence. That is where the ‘darkness’ influences her each and every day.She is not just the personification of the word ‘darkness,’ though. She personifies the word ‘soldier’ as well. Her cold, unflinching demeanor is unaffected by the thousands upon thousands of screaming WOW fans at every show. It is almost like she doesn’t even see them. Her opponents’ pleas for mercy also go unnoticed by this demonic star. She wrenches her opponents’ limbs, until they are a mangled contortion that is barely able to show any signs of life. She breaks her opponents physically and mentally, toying with their will to continue competing. It’s almost inhuman the way this calculating competitor takes down her opponents. With a blackened army of wretched and departed souls backing her and an in-ring style that is built upon being merciless, Desdemeana will have all the motivation she needs to rip a black hole through the center of the WOW universe.                                                                                 
Fire (Taylor Lewis): New generation WOW Superhero the promotion in 2013. Her father tours worldwide as the guitarist for the Steve Miller Band. Her mother has honed her craft for years as a talented actress. Talent, charisma, and energy are in her blood and passion flows through her veins. She combines the intense style of rock n’ roll music with the hard-hitting action of professional wrestling, making her one of the most entertaining entities in WOW - Women of Wrestling. Although being the daughter of a famous musician seems like a glamorous lifestyle, Fire admitted that her upbringing was not always ideal. She lamented to many friends that she wished her father was around more during her formative years--The years when a daughter truly needs the guidance of her father. While Fire never cries or complains about the hand she was dealt, she is aware that there is always that missing piece. As an adolescent, Fire sought out many resources to replace what seemed to be missing in her life. Hobbies, extra-curricular activities, crafts never seemed to interest this rock n’ roll wild child. It wasn’t until she picked up her own guitar, put together a few chords, and belted out the many emotions building up inside of her that she found her release. Fire turned to music. On the wicked Sunset Strip, Fire became engulfed in the dazzling decadence of rock stardom. Fire--like her father--is a natural. She can sing, she can play multiple instruments, and she can ignite an audience. Fire answered her calling, and became the rock-star she continues to be to this day. However, Fire had another calling burning within her. Fire had another spark that had been lit inside the depths of her soul. Fire wanted to fight. Fire wanted to compete. Fire wanted to wrestle! Fire made a few calls to some friends she made on the Sunset Strip, and they all told her that if she wanted to prove just how tough she was, then she needed to prove it against the WOW - Women of Wrestling. Fire took those words to heart, and quickly did what she had to do to solidify her place on the WOW roster. Now, Fire brings her rock-star energy to the fans of WOW, and there is no telling what this unpredictable spitfire of a competitor will do when her music hits and her pyro blasts throughout the arenas.
Frenchie (Marie Gibeault): New generation WOW Superhero the promotion in 2014.
Frost "The Olympian" (Janeshia Adams-Ginyard): New generation WOW Superhero the promotion in 2013. A Pac 10 and NCAA Division –I varsity track-and-field star, and brakeman on the first All-African American bobsledding duo in the United States history with driver, Jamia Jackson is a graduate from the University of California, Berkeley with a degree in Linguistics and African-American studies with an emphasis on Caribbean culture. In the process of studying Linguistics, she became fluent in American Sign Language. Years of focus and dedication to the frigid conditions that bobsledding brought her made Frost a trusted acquaintance of the cold. The sub-zero temperatures and chill-inducing climates became her comfort zone, and when she needed refuge she sought it there. Frost’s intense training regimen took her to one of the coldest places in the world: Calgary, Alberta, Canada. It was in Calgary that Frost found a new home. Her training became so intense that she was eventually isolated from the outside world due to her intense drive and persistence to be the best athlete she possibly could become. The isolation and determination transformed Frost, though. She became self-centered, calculating, methodical, and ruthless. The extended period of loneliness and lack of interaction took this outgoing, friendly competitor, and made her a machine. No longer did she concern herself with the needs of others. Now, she was focused on one person--and one person only--Frost! Frost finally took her intense mindset out of her reclusive residence in Canada’s icy countryside, and entered the hallowed squared circle of professional wrestling. Transitioning from her previous form of athletics to the ring of WOW seemed natural for someone with her aptitudes. However, from the moment she entered WOW, she was resistant to any instruction, any criticism, and any assistance. She immediately set herself apart as a brash, cocky, lone wolf. She shouted. She bragged. She fought and argued every step of the way. Eventually, she alienated everyone in her path. Frost was truly alone, but after her time of isolation in Canada, she preferred it that way. Now, after decades of preparation and patiently waiting for her moment, Frost is poised to conquer her next arena: the WOW – Women of Wrestling. The time has arrived for Frost to reinforce her braggadocios words. Feel her chill. Witness her blizzard. As Frost prepares to put a deep freeze on all of WOW. Spectators will witness how she plans to make her ascent to the icy mountain top and firmly plant her flag as the premiere world-class athlete.
Holidead (Camille Ligon): New generation WOW Superhero the promotion in 2016.
Jade (Jennifer Lee Chan): Original WOW Superhero, She returned to the promotion in 2013. "ANYTHING IS POSSIBLE" Culture, pride, and a fighting spirit have always guided Jade. Her family stressed these values to her growing up, especially her grandmother, who became Jade's biggest fan early on, offering her encouragement in all her endeavors. As a young woman, Jade participated in several forms of athletics that utilized her unique blend of speed and flexibility. Entering WOW satisfied Jade's need for athletic competition as well as the spirit of her family's rich heritage. Initially, Jade experienced great success within WOW as a fan-favorite. However, none of that success translated into the ‘win’ column. After the passing of Jade's grandmother, Jade took an office job as a talent scout for WOW, working directly with WOW executives, Jeanie Buss and David McLane, to discover the next generation of WOW Superheroes. After some time in her new position, Jade's mother presented Jade with a letter Jade's grandmother had written before she died. With that letter came the Jade necklace for which she was named. The emotional, heartfelt letter convinced Jade to return to the ring and become a Superhero once again. Chinese wrestler known for her Samurai Scissors move sometimes called The Jaded Edge. Has a fan in her beloved grandmother. After going winless (except for a disqualification) in her first run in the promotion, celebrated her first victory in WOW.
Jessie Jones (Jessie Belle McCoy): New generation WOW Superhero the promotion in 2013. Have you ever heard of the phrase “Blood is thicker than water?” Well, in the deep Southern regions of the Peach State and hills of Kentucky, blood is thicker than a lot of things. Blood and family mean everything. You do not let anyone disrespect your family, and you damn sure do not let anyone disrespect your heritage. When the new generation of WOW stars began disrespecting those who came before them, one young lady stepped up to defend them. Jessie Jones, a close relative of WOW legend, Selina Majors, vowed not to sit idly by and allow her family and other legends of the ring to be disrespected by anyone. Growing up in the South, Jessie Jones was raised with good ol’ fashioned values. Guns, God, and the love of her family and her country. Jessie was taught to never back down from a fight, and never let them see you cry. With those values instilled in her, Jessie Jones was destined to be a scrappy, resourceful fighter. Throw in the fact that she is a relative of the famous Selina Majors, and you have the makings for one explosive competitor that knows her way around the ring. Jessie Jones set out to make a name for her on the independent circuit of professional wrestling. She wrestled all over the South, making her way up the Mason-Dixon to fight a few Yankees, and even fought along the Ohio River. Jessie Jones is no stranger to a knockdown, drag-out competition, and all her years of experience made her a natural fit for WOW - Women of Wrestling. After seeing the disrespect shown to the elder stateswomen of WOW, Jessie Jones searched deep within herself and recalled the values instilled in her by her family, which is why she decided to be the vocal minority when it came to the new generation of WOW stars standing up for the past stars. With her family by her side and in her corner, Jessie Jones seems poised to show some of these girls that the old school still knows how to rule!. One half of Southern Pride along with Selina Majors.
Jungle Grrrl (Erica Porter): Original WOW Superhero, She returned to the promotion in 2013. Tarzan based wrestler, billed as from being from the Amazon Rainforest. There are phenomenal athletes, and then there’s Jungle Grrrl! She was born the daughter of a Columbian mother and an Irish father. Her parents were two driven, determined individuals that valued education, work-ethic, and strong family values. Those same virtues were passed down to their daughter. When she was just a girl, Jungle Grrrl and her family spent an extended period of time down in South American near her mother’s home in Columbia. A young Jungle Grrrl was soon to discover that living in South America had many privileges. Perhaps the best thing about living down in South America was that Jungle Grrrl had the largest backyard in the world: the Amazon rainforest. Her parents would constantly take her to the Amazon where she could take in the beautiful scenery, observe the incredible wildlife, and run around until she could not go anymore. It was in the Amazon that Jungle Grrrl was able to see first-hand how the jungle really operated. She could see animals swinging from tree-to-tree. She could witness breath-taking sceneries. Most importantly, though, she could observe the hierarchy of the jungle. In the animal kingdom, there is a food-chain. It establishes which animals are dominant over which animals. The smaller animals would avoid the larger animals, because they knew the law of the jungle: “Don’t hunt what you can’t kill.” That phrase would go on to be mantra by which Jungle Grrrl lived her life. After witnessing how much better it was to be at the top of the food chain, and how amazing it felt to establish dominance, Jungle Grrrl set out to be the most dangerous predator in the most dangerous environment. The ring became her jungle. Her opponents became her prey. The championship became her ultimate goal. Upon entering WOW - Women of Wrestling, Jungle Grrrl quickly established herself as the standard-bearer. She became the toughest individual to set foot in the ring thanks to her cardiovascular training, her strength conditioning, and her supreme health awareness. Jungle Grrrl’s used her healthy lifestyle and intense fitness regimen to create her book, “Eat That Monkey”. “Eat That Monkey” became one of the best-selling fitness books and assisted many individuals in changing their eating habits, improving their fitness, and adding years to their lives. Jungle Grrrl is in the best shape of her life. She has a positive outlook, and seems primed to continue her impressive winning ways. The sky is the limit for WOW’s fiercest competitor, and she claims no one can stop her, and if they try to, they’ll learn the law of the jungle the hard way. One of the few near undefeated wrestlers in WOW, she became new WOW World Championship holder after defeating Lana Star. Lana subsequently defeated her for the championship in 2014.
Keta Rush (Keta Meggett): New generation WOW Superhero the promotion in 2013. Feel the Rush! Keta Rush is a dynamo of energy that cannot be contained. Coming to us by way of Los Angeles, California, Keta is a natural-born athlete. She is a high-caliber track and field star during her scholastic years and has maintained an athletic resume that is all a result of hard work, dedication, and a driving force to simply excel. Keta has always been an active personality, which is why she gravitated towards athletics as a young adult. Her breakaway speed and incredible finesse only made it an easy decision when Keta was searching for an activity perfect for her. Track-and-field events were tailor-made for Keta Rush, and she naturally dominated each and every time she took to the track, winning several awards and accolades. Unfortunately, her aptitudes and physical gifts for athletics and sports made her a target, though. A group of girls began to target Keta. They would say hurtful things regarding how she looked, how she spoke, her heritage, and her race. As the insults and remarks became more personal, the pain and hurt grew exponentially for the talented young star. Keta never gave into the antagonizing. She stayed true to her values and her morals. Her efforts to not engage her tormentors proved futile, though, and Keta became the victim of a physical assault. As Keta laid in a hospital bed, broken, bloodied, and beaten by a group of ravenous bullies with a gang-like mentality, she feared the worst, but hope for the best; never losing her positive outlook and attitude. Luckily, Keta’s broken bones and bruises healed exceptionally, and the young track star made a full recovery. Keta made a comeback like never before, and vowed to never be a victim of bullying ever again. After her years of being a victim of intimidation, Keta decided to fight and stand up for those that cannot defend themselves. Like a contemporary superhero, Keta rose to the occasion, and joined the WOW - Women of Wrestling, where she created the Bully Busters, a tag-team designed to provide a voice and hope to those that are facing bullying and possible injustice at every turn. With her tag-team partner, Stephanie La Maravillosa, by her side, The Bully Busters are sure to see their mission through to the end. The Bully Busters have sworn to put an end to all wrongdoings and malfeasants in the world of WOW, and they will never, ever give up on the ones they have promised to inspire, protect and defend.
Khloe Hurtz (Katie Forbes): New WOW Superhero the promotion in 2016.
La Niña (Melissa Santos): New generation WOW Superhero the promotion in 2013. She was born in Nicaragua. Originating from humble beginnings, La Niña was raised by strong individuals that taught her the value of hard-work. They instilled in her what it means to be fighter. Now, La Niña takes her path that she has traveled and follows it to WOW - Women of Wrestling. La Niña’s parents transplanted their family from their nest in Nicaragua and cultivated a new life in the city of West Covina, California. La Niña recalls moving to America fondly. She describes it as a serendipitous moment that she refers to as “destiny.” La Niña believes that she and her family were meant to relocate to America, because she was destined to be a star. The many talents of this lovely young woman were further insurance that stardom was in her future. La Niña, from a young age, developed a fascination and interest in many artistic forms of expression. She discovered she could sing. She developed a passion for dance. She learned to play the flute and the guitar. Athletically, La Niña was a gifted track-and-field star, swimmer, and had a knack for water polo. Her looks also allowed her to pursue professional modeling. Needless to say, this young woman became a modern marvel with all of her multi-faceted abilities that could lend credibility to her artistically and athletically. La Niña proved from a young age that she was an absolute threat. The experience of school, though, wasn’t always a positive atmosphere for the gifted young woman from West Covina.  La Niña explained that high school was extremely difficult for her, because there was a group of girls--or a posse--that would stalk her, harass her, and pick on her. This led to La Niña’s frustration building and mounting to the point that she became embroiled in numerous fights throughout her scholastic years. For a girl whose mother and father fought and strived every day to provide a better living, La Niña saw it only fit that she fight and stand up for herself. All of the experiences that hardened her and toughened her up altered La Niña’s mentality. Everything became a fight. Every moment became a struggle. With this chip on her shoulder and chiseled attitude, La Niña proclaimed herself a “guerrillera,” or warrior. She knew that if she ever wanted to accomplish or achieve anything in this world, she would have to scrap, claw, and climb her way to the pinnacle. She had to fight to reach her summit. It was not just going to come easily to her. Upon entering WOW - Women of Wrestling, she instantly bonded with Paradise. The two traveled together, fought side-by-side, and confided in one another. They became so close that La Niña began referring to Paradise as her “road dog.” The bond between the two has proven unbreakable. With Paradise being a native of the exotic Tonga, and La Niña’s powerful presence and attitude, the tandem dubbed them the “Tropical Storm.” They vow to catch any competition in the eye of their storm. One half of Tropical Storm along with Paradise.
Lady London (Georgina Rawlings): New WOW Superhero the promotion in 2013. The bravest heroes always ride in on a horse and save the day just as all hope is lost. For the current generation of female professional wrestlers there is such a hero. Her name is Lady London. From across the Pond in Jolly Ol’ England, Lady London was raised on the hard-nosed ethics and morals of Britain’s working class. Although she never went without, she was taught the value of hard-work, discipline, and perseverance--lessons that would later prove valuable for this Superhero. As a young girl, she fell in love with the outdoors. She was constantly active and always moving. Her greatest activity, though, was the equestrian arts. Lady London rode horses from sun-up to sun-down. Every free moment she had was spent in the stables grooming her horses, out gallivanting with her favorite equine friends, or preparing for her next competition. Lady London has always possessed a passion for riding. A natural athlete and competitor, it was not long before Lady London dominated contests such as horseback riding and show-jumping. Her constant will to be the best directed her to other avenues, though. Her interests led her to WOW - Women of Wrestling, where she was able to adapt her training of horses into her strategic manipulation of her opponents. Lady London said that defeating an opponent in the ring is like training one of the large, beautiful animals to which she devoted the early part of her life. She commented that there is virtually no difference in making the horse follow her instruction and making her opponent fall to her superior ability. A lofty statement indeed. Prepare for a new breed of professional wrestler. Brace yourselves for the thoroughbred of female athlete. She has been able to display dominance over one species. Can she do the same in WOW - Women of Wrestling and rise up the ranks? With her riding crop in hand, she will soon put that theory to the test.
Lana Star (Lana Kinnear): Original WOW Superhero, She returned to the promotion in 2013. Born in the heart of Hollywood, raised on the excess of the Southern California lifestyle, and trained to simply be better, the fabulous Lana Star defines what it means to be a California girl. Lana Star’s craving of the spotlight and longing to be the center of attention at a young age produced a successful career in acting and in modeling. She has appeared in commercials for Tag Body Spray, Subaru, and Ford. She has been featured in music videos for Good Charlotte, Kid Rock, and Eminem. Lana has also graced the silver screen in blockbuster motion pictures and stood side-by-side with some of the world’s greatest actors such as Kevin Spacey, Robert Downey, Jr., Mike Myers, and Rob Lowe. The fabulous one gained a measure of notoriety when she posed for Playboy Magazine. She even garnered the attention of the editor-in-chief, Mr. Hugh Hefner, who invited her to live at the Playboy Mansion--a high honor for the blonde starlet. Eventually, Lana’s road led to the squared circle where she instantly dominated her competition as a member of WOW - Women of Wrestling. Defeating the best athletes WOW had to offer, Lana eventually defeated Terri Gold to become the WOW-World Champion. After winning the championship, Lana did not look back. In fact, her schedule had become so demanding that she began going through a slew of personal assistants; none of whom were able to keep up with her numerous commitments. The search ended, though, when she found Kitty, a fellow California blonde born right under the Hollywood sign. Together, Lana Star and her personal assistant, Kitty, plan to keep Lana’s place atop the pinnacle of WOW - Women of Wrestling. One of WOW's marquee performers. Often called the Fabulous Lana Star. A movie star wannabe who often used dirty tricks and cheating such as smashing hand mirrors and spraying hair spray in her opponent's eyes to win her matches. Despite her underhanded tactics, she also proved herself to be a good technical wrestler. Known for her finishing move, The Lana Star Facelift. Arrogantly called Women of Wrestling, "the Lana Star Show". Had a personal assistant called Kitty, whom she fired. In a non-televised match, Lana finally achieved championship gold by defeating Terri Gold for the WOW championship. She returned to the promotion, as the champion in 2013, until she was defeated by fellow original WOW girl, Jungle Grrrl. In January 2014, Lana defeated Jungle Grrrl and regained the title. Succeeded in turning Amber O'Neal against her partner (as she had previously done with Patti Pizzazz) and turned her into the Beverly Hills Babe.
Loca (Cher Ferreyra): Original WOW Superhero, She returned to the promotion in 2013. Prisoner from Nevada State Penitentiary. One third of Caged Heat, along with Delta Lotta Pain and Vendetta. She and Delta (sans Vendetta) returned to the promotion in 2013. What time is it? Hard times! Loca, one-half of the tag team Caged Heat with her partner and enforcer, Delta Lotta Pain. Combined, they have the reputation of being the baddest duo on the planet. Loca is the fiery Latina with an awful attitude. Her only ally in life is her fellow inmate and tag team partner, Delta Lotta Pain. Together, they decimated opponents using their hardcore, prison tactics. Their smash-mouth style left their competition in a wake of devastation. Many opponents were unprepared for the unorthodox style of two of WOW’s most tenured competitors. Loca and Delta Lotta Pain employed the services of Sophia Lopez, a unique public defender with a track record for getting long-time inmates out of prison. With Ms. Lopez’ help, Caged Heat can now call themselves FORMER residents of the Nevada State Correctional Facility. Now on parole, there is no telling where Loca and Delta Lotta Pain will take their bad attitudes. Former WOW World Tag Team Championship holders.
Paradise (Maria Nunez): Original WOW Superhero, She returned to the promotion in 2013. Island girl wrestler from Tonga. For some people, paradise is a far off destination with serene landscapes and a relaxing environment. For others, it is just a state of mind. For WOW fans, Paradise is one of the most exhilarating Superheroes to ever set foot inside the ring. A proud Las Vegas native, Paradise’s knowledge of Sin City is second-to-none. She has lived and worked in the city for more than a decade, and is proud to call this little slice of Nevada her home. Paradise started out as a dancer at a series of shows out of the Flamingo Hotel. Following that, she became a cocktail waitress at the Rampart—a property owned and operated by Cannery Casino Resorts, a company that also runs the Eastside Cannery Hotel and Casino (WOW’s Las Vegas home). In fact, it was a conversation with customers at the Rampart coupled with the urging of her children that inspired Paradise to return to the ring. This lovely and talented wife and mother of three is not just a graceful dancer and stellar waitress. She’s a lethal combination of speed, intelligence, agility, and experience. Paradise is a master of Chinese Kempo karate. She has wrestled all over the world, and her experience in the ring is incomparable. Upon re-entering WOW at the request of her family, Paradise was looking at the newest crop of talent that WOW had been introducing. One girl in particular caught her eye. Paradise saw a brash, arrogant, cocky loud-mouth by the name of La Niña and immediately took to her. She was entertained by La Niña’s fiery spirit, intense confidence, and athleticism. She took the young star under her wing, and began teaching her the ropes. Before long, Paradise and La Niña were inseparable. They were two peas in a pod. They ran together. They talked trash together. They beat people together. The tandem proclaimed them “Tropical Storm” and vowed that they would defeat any other alliance in WOW. Now, this duo sets out to make their mark in the tag team division of WOW, and they have their sights set on the World Tag Team Championship! With a wealth of knowledge at her disposal, lethal in-ring abilities, and her newest ally--La Niña-- by her side, Paradise seems to be one of WOW’s hottest commodities. One half of Tropical Storm along with La Niña.
Razor: New generation WOW Superhero the promotion in 2016. Tag team partner of Spike managed by Riot.
Santana Garrett: New generation WOW Superhero the promotion in 2013. She was born the daughter of a professional wrestler. This sport is in her blood. Santana Garrett was destined for greatness the moment she entered this world. She watched her father toil away for years on the independent wrestling circuit in the South. He went from town-to-town, show-to-show trying to make a living. Was it always easy? Not always. He had a passion for it, though, a passion that would never, ever cease. Her father’s passion continues to live in her. Wrestling is now her passion! From the minute Santana Garrett learned to move, her father instilled in his daughter an unbridled work-ethic, the will to succeed, and that very same passion that kept him going on those seemingly endless nights fighting for greatness inside that ring. Santana Garrett is a second-generation wrestling mega-star with the world in-front of her, and at only 24 years old, she is poised to take the world in the palm of her hand and conquer it. Santana, like her father, worked at honing her craft. Throughout the state of Florida, the fans know her as their home-grown hero. She represents the same code the citizens of the Sunshine State live by each and every day. She has trained day-after-day to make herself better, to improve her in-ring ability. She has poured every ounce of sweat into her career. She has broken bones. She has suffered heartache and sacrificed it all so that she may one day stand under the pale spotlight and call herself a champion. WOW - Women of Wrestling has presented Santana Garrett, the young-but-experienced star of the ring, with the opportunity she has so desperately fought for in the last few years. Santana Garrett has put in the effort. She has put in the hard work. She has taken calculated risks, and the path she has blazed has landed her here. For Santana Garrett, this is her time. This is her moment. There are people that anticipate a moment like this for eternity. For some, it never appears. For Santana Garrett, it is in her grasp. It is within her reach. It is within her fingertips. Can she seize it? What will she make of her moment?. One half of the new WOW World Tag Team Championship holders in 2013, The All American Girls. Lost her tag team partner Amber O'Neal, when she was turned against Garrett by Lana Star.
Selina Majors "The Real Deal": Original WOW Superhero, She returned to the promotion in 2013. Four time WOW World Championship holder. "ALL ABOUT THAT SOUTHERN PRIDE" During her childhood in Stone Mountain, Georgia, Selina Majors was always taught that wrestling was a man's sport. Women were just a warm-up match; never the main event. Selina and a few other talented ladies challenged that perception and demanded respect for their abilities. Selina had her pride—Southern Pride—and she wasn't going to let any other wrestler, man or woman, show her up. A true fan favorite, it didn't take long for Selina Majors’ name to become synonymous with women's wrestling. Her bouts became the stuff of legend and she toured all over the world. One rival, another Georgia wrestler named Thug, took particular offense to being shown up by Selina. When Selina joined WOW, Thug followed. Selina blamed Thug for preventing her from taking the WOW Championship, sparking the greatest feud in WOW history. The ring veteran is also a trainer for new wrestlers, and sometimes the brash, physically gifted youngsters can't relate to the dues Selina had to pay to open the doors they are now walking through. Those young wrestlers have found that if you don't give Selina her respect, she might just beat it into you. Recently, Selina brought a new wrestler to WOW, her relative Jessie Jones, to back her up. Together they are going to show everyone what Southern Pride is all about! She returned to Women of Wrestling as the current roster's official trainer and as one half of Southern Pride along with Jessie Jones.
Spike (Ashly Martinez): New generation WOW Superhero the promotion in 2013. "Niece" of former WOW wrestler Thug. The streets of Los Angeles have been home to the vagrants of Southern California for years. Many of them dream of greatness, but few ever realize it. For Spike, she called those very streets her home. She wallowed in the muck and the filth of L.A.’s gritty alleyways hoping and dreaming of the same greatness everyone desires. Unlike the rest of the citizens in Los Angeles’ seedy underworld, Spike has finally made her dreams into reality. Abusive authority figures, absentee parents, and years of misfortune transformed Spike from a little girl with aspirations to a hardened woman with low self-esteem. She felt like she didn’t belong. She felt rejected. She was an outcast everywhere she went. The pain never alleviated. The torment never ended. Spike was a prisoner in her own skin. She was a victim of the cruelty of the world. Despite a poor self-image and negative energy all around her, Spike always wanted more. She felt like she was destined for something better. She couldn’t put her finger on it, but had inkling that the streets of L.A. were not all the world had to offer her. Little did she know she was right? Spike had always been a fan of professional wrestling while she was growing up in a broken home. It was an escape for her. It was a release. She saw women being portrayed in a positive light. She saw women exhibiting their strength. Whereas Spike was made to feel weak, obedient, and diminished on a daily basis. It demonstrated to her that there was more to life. Wrestling displayed to Spike that she doesn’t have to always be a victim. She learned that she could be strong. She could be an athlete. She saw that she had the potential to be a warrior. Finally, Spike made the connection and set out on the career she had always wanted. She trained daily and nightly to become the powerful woman she knew she could be. After being under the tutelage of a very skilled trainer, Spike was on the path to wrestling greatness. Eventually, Spike discovered that her aunt Peggy--that she had not seen in over a decade--was a well-known professional wrestler. WOW fans knew Spike aunt Peggy by her ring name, “Thug.” Once she learned of her aunt’s notoriety, Spike was contacted by WOW officials to join them in Las Vegas as they presented her aunt Thug with the Princess Jasmine Trailblazer Award. Spike happily accepted, and rejoiced at the chance to be reunited with her aunt Thug. Yes, Spike has had a rough road, but it finally appears that Spike’s luck is turning around. With a championship level pedigree and fortune on her side, Spike is poised to change the minds of all those that ever held her down and ever doubted her. Managed by Riot
Stephy Slays (Stephanie Mason): New generation WOW Superhero the promotion in 2013. Formerly Stephanie La Maravillosa, They say she’s “simply wonderful,” and it’s easy to see why. Stephanie has the youthful exuberance, captivating smile, and endless charisma it takes to win the hearts of anyone she meets. When you factor in her inherent athleticism and physical prowess, it is evident that Stephanie La Maravillosa is a force to be reckoned with in WOW - Women of Wrestling. Stephanie calls Dallas, Texas her home, and like many citizens of the Lone Star State, she feels a great pride in her home, her tradition, and her culture. Coming from a predominantly Hispanic family, Stephanie is honored to represent her family and her people every time she is able to step into the ring. Her pride did not come easily, however. Growing up without a father made life difficult for Stephanie, and the other children did not make things any easier. Stephanie consistently found herself on the wrong end of harmful teasing that--eventually--escalated into hurtful insults that tore into her personal and home life. Children would tease Stephanie for not having a father. They would poke fun at her, run her down, and belittle her for anything and everything they could target on the charming young star. Luckily, though, Stephanie was able to rise above the bullying, the torment, and the senseless acrimony thrown at her by her peers. She was able to prove that she is better than the words others would cast in her direction. She was able to put it all behind her, and focus on what really mattered: her academics, her family, and her happiness. After graduating high school, Stephanie made it a goal to join the WOW - Women of Wrestling. She trained day-and-night, and took endless bumps to prove that she was tougher than anyone had given her credit for, including the bullies from her past. Her mission in WOW is simple: eliminate bullying, intimidation, and injustice from WOW. She has joined forces with fellow Bully Buster, Keta Rush, and together these two remarkable athletes plan on being the beacons of hope for any and all victims of bullying. Together they stand to fend off anyone looking to bully their way to the top, and they will not rest until all bullies have been busted!. One half of the Bully Busters along with Keta Rush.
Sunshine (Jamila Griffith): New generation WOW Superhero the promotion in 2013. Inspired by The Beach Patrol (original WOW girls Sandy and Summer). Big smile, driven competitor, she is the ultimate California girl. She can entertain the fans and light up a room, but make no mistake about it, when that bell rings Sunshine is here to make a name for her. She is the embodiment of what every California girl dreams of becoming; in fact, she was a contestant for Miss California USA. Sunshine is a supreme, tough athlete, as well. She is one of very few to complete the insanity workout challenge. Not to mention, that she is an accomplished track and field star with her specialty being the high-jump. Also, she is a multifaceted performer having been an actress and participating in several reality shows including ABC Network’s “Wipeout.” After excelling in athletics, acting, and proving she has what it takes to succeed; Sunshine sparked an interest in the sport of professional wrestling. She was a fan of WOW’s original Beach Patrol: Sandy and Summer. Having been inspired by them, Sunshine set out to become a student of wrestling, mastering their famous maneuver: the Sunset Flip. Now, she’s one of the most beloved WOW Superheroes with supporters all over the world. Her fans love when her music hits, because there’s always a party when Sunshine enters the ring, as she always tosses beach balls to the audience, slaps five, and tells the fans to hang ten. With her radiant personality, wrestling acumen, and impressive athletic ability, Sunshine is primed to make fans say WOW!.
Tatevik "The Gamer" (Tatevik Hunanyan): New generation WOW Superhero the promotion in 2013. Level up! Tatevik ‘The Gamer’ is an avid video game enthusiast, expert martial artist, and international sensation capturing the hearts of WOW - Women of Wrestling fans everywhere. Born in Yerevan, Armenia, Tatevik’s parents quickly relocated to the lovely area of Glendale, California. Tatevik’s parents engrained in her the values of their homeland, which kept Tatevik grounded and in-touch with her homeland and its tradition. From an early age, Tatevik showed proficiency in dancing. Her grace and agility allowed her to begin learning contemporary ballet at age five. Then, by age fifteen, Tatevik was dancing the Argentine Tango. She also had the privilege of working with renowned dancer Sergie Tumas. In 2009, Tatevik made the bold transition into acting in films and television. She quickly had the opportunity to work on several great projects, including working on the film, “Rush,” starring Randy “The Natural” Couture and Dolph Lundrgen of “Rocky IV” fame. In 2010, Tatevik was introduced to world-class martial arts trainer, Benny “The Jet” Urquidez. With Urquidez, Tatevik began extensive training in several forms of martial arts, including kickboxing. Tatevik’s martial arts skills allowed her to become a 6th degree Ukidokan master. With her background in dance, acting, and martial arts, Tatevik desired a career that would allow her to pursue all of those ventures in one. Thus, Tatevik became a WOW Superhero. In WOW, Tatevik is able to show her graceful side, her charisma, and her intense physicality inside the wrestling ring. It is the perfect habitat and environment for someone with such an extensive and impressive resume.Fans are quickly taking to this Armenian-born Superhero, and it is no wonder why when you see her stunning beauty and dazzling personality. Make no mistake, though, this athlete has a competitive side that can carry her to the top. There’s a reason they call her the “Lady with the Lethal Legs!” Watch out, because if you’re not careful, she has a kick waiting with your name on it!.
Thug (Peggy Lee Leather): Original WOW Superhero, She returned to the promotion in 2013. When you hear the roar of that Harley Davidson motorcycle, you know it means one of two things… Either Thug is here to have a good time, or her opponents are in for a not-so-good time. Thug has wrestled for crowds all over the world. From Reynolds, Georgia to Tokyo, Japan, from Enid, Oklahoma to Guadalajara, Mexico, Thug has knocked skulls all across this globe, and she’s loved every second of it. One of Thug’s earliest workplaces was the World Wrestling Federation, wrestling with the likes of Wendi Richter and Velvet McIntyre. From there, Thug wrestled in the American Wrestling Association for Verne Gagne and in World Championship Wrestling. Thug’s truest tests, though, came overseas when she wrestled in Japan. Thug recalls stories of wrestling for nearly two hours against some of the world’s greatest warriors. Long after the sweat stopped pouring, long after her legs wanted to give out, long after the blood felt like it would stop pumping, and Thug’s passion for competition kept her going. Her broadways inside the squared circle have become the stuff of legends, and it has cemented her in the record books as one of professional wrestling’s greatest stars. All of her hard work, dedication, and endless passion brought Thug to the greatest women’s wrestling organization around: WOW - Women of Wrestling. Though Thug’s experience taught her the value of hard work, it also demonstrated the benefit of bending the rules. Thug brought her lackeys with her, and they quickly earned a reputation for their gang mentality. They even put Thug’s long-time rival, Selina Majors, on the shelf. After a brutal Cage Match, though, it seemed the bitter blood-feud between Selina and Thug had come to an end. Now, with Thug’s days of battling behind her, she sets out to pave way for the next generation of WOW Superheroes as they make the dangerous trek from rookie to legends, much like Thug. Although her days of in-ring competition are behind her, make no mistake, Thug still has a few tricks up her sleeve. Just you wait and see. Mentor of her "niece" Spike.

WOW Tag Teams (season 2–4)

The original new tag teams. The only tag team that returned to the promotion was Caged Heat.

The official teams

The Bully Busters: Keta Rush and Stephy Slays (formerly known Stephanie LaMaravillosa)
Caged Heat: Delta Lotta Pain and Loca with the Atty. Sophia Lopez, representative.
Razor and Spike with Riot, representative.
The Southern Pride: Jessie Jones and Selina Majors
Tropical Storm: La Niña and Paradise
The former teams.
Abilene Maverick the Governor's Daughter and Candice LeRae
The All American Girls: Amber O'Neal and Santana Garrett

WOW Superheroes manager and assistant (season 2–4)

The original WOW Superhero is only  Riot.

Kitty (Holly Meowy) A new personal assistant of the WOW World Champion, Lana Star. Some people are born under bad signs. Some people are born under good signs. Then, there’s Kitty. She was born under the Hollywood sign. And yes, this is actually true…. Kitty was born under the Hollywood sign and has lived her entire live in Hollywood. Kitty can often be seen at Red Carpet events around LA, is the definition of the excesses of Hollywood. Lips dripping with gloss. Hair stiff with product. Not to mention, she’s always covered in thousand dollar clothes. Kitty is an over-the-top Hollywood blonde that’s name is symbolic in that she loves cats. Wrapping her in the Hollywood culture it was no surprise that Kitty soon became friends with Lana Star. When Lana was seeking a new assistant, Kitty pushed aside the hundreds of candidates to become the personal assistant for long-time WOW World Champion, Lana Star. Kitty’s the perfect accessory to Lana …. She is gorgeous, smart, and knows how to use a mirror. Whenever Lana Star needs a helping hand, Kitty is always close at hand and willing to provide words of comfort or even lends her mirror when needed …. To the heads of Lana’s opponents.
Riot: Original WOW Superhero, A rebellious loner. She returned to the promotion in 2016. "THE CONJUROR OF CHAOS" Rebellion is a mythical hydra—try to kill it and it will only multiply. The same goes for Riot. Despite WOW officials’ best efforts to keep this wrestler out of the main event, the appeal of Riot couldn't be contained. Even when she left the world of the squared circle to wreak havoc in films, fans kept the spark of her revolution alive. For them, Riot was destined to come back to the ring—it was just a matter of when. But this time around Riot's determined to craft her own destiny and take a page out of Hollywood's book. She wants to write the script herself and push the boundaries of her own dark, twisted imagination. She aims to test the limits of those she recruits to do her bidding. Like a dark sorcerer, Riot has gathered all the ingredients for this recipe of terror and is prepared to dish out chaos. She is the manager of her trio with Razor and Spike.
Sophia López (Leslie Garza): Scholars say that law is what differentiates man from animal. It separates humanity from the remainder of the animal kingdom. Law is the dividing line between civility and savagery. Those that practice the law are a proud few men and women that hold the gravity of it within their hands. Attorneys, lawyers, defenders are all individuals that strive to make the justice system the crown jewel of mankind’s existence. Sophia Lopez is an attorney that represents the values of the American justice system. With her shrewd attitude, vast knowledge of legal precedents, and gift of gab, it is no wonder that this gifted lawyer was able to put an end to the jail sentence of two of the WOW’s worst offenders: Loca and Delta Lotta Pain--Caged Heat! Coming from a proud Mexican heritage, Sophia Lopez grew up with a curious mind. As a child, she would see the world around her, and question its ways. Eventually, that curiosity of the world grew into a fascination with everything around her. Sophia wanted to learn the way the world operated. She wanted to know what made it tick. She wanted to know what maintained order and balance. That interest set her on the path of studying the law. As a student, Sophia worked tirelessly in school to climb to the top of her class. Eventually, she earned herself a degree practicing law. She was coveted by some of the top law offices in the nation. They would lay down offers that would make anyone else sign in an instant. However, Sophia Lopez wanted to do something different with her life. She wanted to help the wrongly accused. Her most high-profile clients are WOW’s most dominant tag team: Caged Heat. Representing Delta Lotta Pain and Loca in their parole hearings, Sophia Lopez was able to get the long-time criminals freed. Eternally grateful to their defender, Caged Heat offered Sophia a spot at ringside as they pummeled opponents mercilessly as a show of thanks to Sophia for all her hard work in getting them out of prison. Who knows what other high-profile clients are ahead for Sophia Lopez? For now, though, she is doing a phenomenal job as the heralded public defender for one of WOW’s most influential tag teams. New official representation of Caged Heat. Succeeded in getting the prison team out of prison.

List of episodes (season 2) 2013

The series is streaming online on wowe.com website and YouTube.

Below are the results of the matches aired on the WOW website and the approximate dates they aired.

List of episodes (season 3) 2013

The series is streaming online on wowe.com website and YouTube.

Below are the results of the matches aired on the WOW website and the approximate dates they aired.

List of episodes (season 4) 2016

The series is streaming online on wowe.com website and YouTube.

Below are the results of the matches aired on the WOW website and the approximate dates they aired.

WOW (season 5–7)

WOW Superheroes (2018–2019) 

Abilene Maverick "The Governor's Daughter" (Callee Wilkerson): The second generation of WOW Superhero. "THE GOVERNOR’S DAUGHTER" Born in College Station, Texas- the home of Texas A&M University. Abilene Maverick knows a thing or two about pride, showmanship, tradition and family. With a family raised on playing sports, Abilene and her siblings would vie for their father attention. It was Abilene, the tomboy of the family who became the apple of her father's eye. They would play sports together, dance together, and watch wrestling together. They were inseparable. However, during her final year of college. Abilene's  father suddenly died in front of the TV. Abilene was heartbroken, that's when her mother, who had forged a successful career in politics, stepped in and suggested Abilene make her Dad proud by pursuing a career in wrestling, Abilene “The Governor’s Daughter” enter WOW as a kind, caring individual representing grace, poise and polished elegance. However, the smile that seemed to come naturally now appears forced. Her cheery disposition seems replaced by a sense of putting on airs. A sharp sarcasm has emerged that has WOW Superheroes unsure how to interpret her behavior. Is everyone seeing the real Abilene Maverick? Or are they seeing someone on edge. Someone who is trying to please a father that is looking down or a mother that is looking up? Is Abilene actually kind, or she evil personified, hardened by the resentment of loss? And the tag team partner of the Disciplinarian under the managed of Samantha Smart, for the WOW World Tag team Championship series.
Adrenaline (Priscilla Zuniga): The third generation of WOW Superhero the promotion in 2019. "BETTER, FASTER, STRONGER" Born and raised in Miami, Florida, Adrenaline lives life in the fast lane! With unmatched speed and agility, she was set to blaze a dashing trail in the world of women's wrestling. But all of that momentum came to a screeching halt when back to back injuries forced her from the scene. But now Adrenaline is back and better than ever! Her drive and will to fight her way back to the top made her the perfect companion to Fire, another heartfelt hero. Together the two fought their way through the WOW Tag Team Championship tournament, facing the final boss monsters of Havok and Hazard. Shocking the WOW world, Fire and Adrenaline won the day, becoming the new WOW Tag Team Champions. Whatever comes next for the pair, Fire and Adrenaline are ready to face whatever comes at them—together! And the current WOW World Tag team Championship holder along with Fire.
Adriana Gambino (Noelle Giorgi): The third generation of WOW Superhero the promotion in 2019. "THE DIAMOND AND THE ROUGH" Hailing from New Jersey, New York, Adriana Gambino values loyalty above all else. Always dressed to kill, Adriana is careful, calculating and never forgets a face. Evasive when it comes to her family's business in New Jersey, Adriana maintains that they're involved in ‘waste management’ but remains ambiguous when it comes to the specifics. Declining to elaborate on her role within the family administration, Adriana instead focuses on her relationship and affection for her father, Don. Following the mysterious disappearance and subsequent grisly discovery of her ex-boyfriend's body, Adriana arrived at WOW amid accusations of foul play. However, with the murder trial curiously settling out of court, Adriana is forging a new path in the world of wrestling. With a strange knack for poker, blackjack, and a gaze that could cut, Adriana comes with a warning—cross her and you may find yourself with a new pair of shoes. A pair you may never be able to remove...
Amber O’Neal (Kimberly Dawn Davis): The second generation of WOW Superhero. Who says you can never return home? Many people told that to Amber O’Neal after she committed several reprehensible offenses leading to an alliance with ‘The Fabulous One’ Lana Star. She betrayed a long-time tag team partner. She turned her back on her supporters. She uprooted her life in North Carolina and traded it in for the golden lifestyle of a Beverly Hills celebrity in the lap of luxury with her new associate. Amber O’Neal began as a tough, rugged woman from the Queen City of Charlotte, North Carolina. She called the infamous hills of North Carolina her backyard. She enjoyed trips out to the woodlands of Tar Heel country with her dirt bike. She would leap over mounds of dirt and Earth in her bike not unlike a superhero. Amber enjoyed a life far from the glamour of Hollywood—far from the clutches of Lana Star. The wrestling career of Amber O’Neal started many years ago when she aligned with a fellow southerner, Krissy Vaine. Together, Amber and Krissy took on the tandem title of ‘Team Blondage’, and they captured the hearts and attention of countless fans in the Mid-Atlantic region of the United States. Their popularity soared to unbelievable heights. Ultimately, their careers took them in two different directions. The road followed by Amber O’Neal brought her to WOW – Women Of Wrestling where she used her tag-team wrestling expertise to capture the Tag Team Championship. With her success, however, came an ego that proved to be insurmountable, and Lana Star capitalized on the swelling head of Amber O’Neal. Lana took Amber O’Neal and rechristened her ‘The Beverly Hills Babe’. With the new name came a new lavishness Amber had never before experienced. The posh extravagance seduced Amber, and Lana knew she had the Babe right where she wanted her9i Amber was under Lana's thumb, and there was nothing she could do now except collapse under the pressure. Numerous opportunities at the WOW World Championship ended in failure and dismay for Amber, and the lack of victorious outcomes frustrated The Fabulous One. Lana sought instant gratification, and Amber did not deliver in the slightest. Lana publicly relieved Amber O’Neal of her duties. She stripped Amber of the ‘Beverly Hills Babe’ name, humiliated the former Tag Team Champion, and dismissed her in embarrassing fashion. It seemed as though things could get no worse for Amber O’Neal. In that moment of defeat, however, Amber turned to an old friend—fellow WOW Superhero—Jessie Jones. Jessie Jones has now taken Amber O’Neal on as a tag team partner. These two competitors have set out with the mission of becoming the best tag team in WOW and hope to place the silver WOW Tag Team Championship belts across their waists. Amber O’Neal has taken a tumultuous road to get this point in her life, but with a good friend by her side and her eyes on the Tag Team Championship, this broken road may finally lead her home.
The Beast (Twana Ferguson): The third generation of WOW Superhero the promotion in 2018. "COME GET SOME" Beware: The Beast is here! From the moment she arrived at WOW - Women Of Wrestling, The Beast made it clear she was here for one thing: to make her mark on the wrestling world. The current WOW World Champion has done just that: defeating The Born Legend, Tessa Blanchard, to gain the title and prove her dominance to a world that dared to doubt her. No other woman on the roster has the size and strength of The Beast, who tends to make short work of her “prey”. Trained in Krav Maga and other brutal fighting forms, The Beast claims that whatever any of the other WOW Superheroes give to her, she'll give back twice as hard. How will she forge her own legacy now that she is the WOW World Champion?.
Cali Ray (Kirsten Young):  The third generation of WOW Superhero the promotion in 2019. "COWABUNGA!" With her sunny, carefree disposition, beach bunny Cali Ray delivers gnarly surfer girl skills and chilled out California vibes to the WOW ring. When she's not honing her wrestling skills, Cali Ray spends her time catching waves and rays off the coast of Southern California. Cali Ray's surfing abilities have helped to give her wrestling a dynamic athleticism and stability, making her an enduring and versatile competitor. Priding herself on her positive attitude, and never fearing a wipeout, Cali Ray considers all setbacks to be learning opportunities. This outlook helps Cali Ray to push her opponents to their point break, and have fun while she's doing it. Good vibrations and beachside vacations forever. Put on your wetsuit and jump on your surfboard—Cali Ray's wave is breaking into WOW. Tubular.
Casey Dakota (Sarah Stallman):  The third generation of WOW Superhero the promotion in 2019. "GIDDY UP" Hailing from Granger, Iowa, and Casey Dakota is a horse riding, line dancing, hog tying, and cowgirl. Spirited and agile, don't let Casey Dakota's good manners fool you, she isn't afraid to throw down for a show down, and she always gets back on the horse. Currently residing on a ranch in California, Casey spends her days in the sun, taking care of her horses and working the land. A firm believer in dedication and patience, ranch living has helped Casey hone the stamina and perseverance needed to hold her own in the ring. With a background in bodybuilding and dance, Casey has extraordinary focus and self-discipline, making her a strong and resilient opponent. Tough as nails and twice as useful, Casey Dakota is ready to round up the competition and ‘lasso’ them what cowgirls are made of. Giddy up.
Chainsaw: The third generation of WOW Superhero the promotion in 2019. "DO NOT DISTURB… FURTHER" Chainsaw was raised with her sister, Angelica Dante, on a cornfield in Kingsland, Texas. However, when asked about her life on the farm, Chainsaw only remembers two things—her sister, and the darkness. As punishment for being a naughty, wicked girl, Chainsaw's daddy took actions to ensure that she would not be a danger to herself or others. But, after Momma met an untimely end in a freak farming accident, Chainsaw began doubting Daddy's judgment. That was when the screaming started—Chainsaw began having what Daddy called ‘episodes’. In secret, Angelica would sneak into the basement to visit Chainsaw. Angelica always told her that she was special and that one day, they would sneak away together and lead exciting lives in the big city. It was a cool summer night when that day finally came. After tying up a few loose ends at the farm, the sisters started their new adventure. Now, having made their way to WOW, Angelica and Chainsaw are enjoying their new home. While Chainsaw may not have a lot to say, she understands what it is to triumph over those who would try to keep her down. When the jacket comes off, she will do anything to make her beloved sister Angelica happy. 
Chantilly Chella (Rachel Kelvington Bostic): The third generation of WOW Superhero the promotion in 2018. "DANCING QUEEN" Get ready, because the beat is about to drop! Chantilly Chella brings the world of Electronic Dance Music to the ring. Her in-ring style mirrors the fluidity and energy that EDM brings to its legions of listeners. Erratic tempo, unpredictable hits, and unrelenting motion are words that describe the hit songs of Zedd, Calvin Harris, and Skrillex, but the WOW Superheroes have used these words to describe Chantilly's never-before-seen onslaught of ring maneuvers. The Inland Empress stood out as a regular at Coachella, Bonaroo, and South-by-Southwest for years as a chill, laid-back, go-with-the-flow individual with an easy-going attitude. What her fellow festival attendees did not know, however, was that a fiery, heroic combatant lay dormant beneath the surface, waiting to dropkick her way into the WOW ring! Chantilly Chella brings positive vibes to the WOW Superheroes, but once the soundcheck is over... looks out, because the beat won't be the only thing pounding in her opponents’ heads! Tag team partner of the Sassy Massy.
The Dagger (Michelle Blanchard): The second generation of WOW Superhero the promotion in 2016. "WHO HAS A DEATH WISH?" Like any young, rebellious teen, The Dagger was fascinated with sharp objects. Raised in the Bay Area of Northern California, Dagger would sneak out at night for daredevil exploits with her friends. Sensing a mutual interest, her father introduced her to his weapons collection, and the two formed a strong bond. She went on to build a collection of her own knives, which she calls her “babies” They are just collector's items of course! Unfortunately, Dagger's happiness would not last. Though she went on to start a family of her own, the mysterious death of her abusive husband cast a shadow over her life, and gained Dagger unwanted notoriety, with some suggesting her husband died under suspicious circumstances. However, Dagger's lawyer, Sophia Lopez, successfully defended her innocence, pointing out that although she has a short fuse, she could not possibly have murdered her own husband! With years of MMA training under her belt and at the recommendation of her legal counsel, Dagger has joined WOW as a way to rebuild her public image and as an outlet for all that...anger. Attorney Sophia Lopez also introduced The Dagger to The Temptress, another woman treated unfairly by an unfair system. The two birds of a feather flocked together to form the Vengeful Vixens tag team and the other WOW Superheroes better watch out: because The Dagger will do anything to get what she wants.
The Disciplinarian (Robyn Reid): The third generation of WOW Superhero the promotion in 2018. "TEACHER TROUBLE" People like to say that “Kids today lack discipline” but The Disciplinarian knows the truth: EVERYONE nowadays lacks discipline, and she's here to solve that problem, one paddle at a time! Sent by the South Carolina Board of Education, the strict, southern teacher was hired by Samantha Smart to crack down on the unruly and uncooperative Superheroes of WOW. Some might find it surprising that an educator of young minds participates in such a physical sport, but The Disciplinarian has always believed in a “hands on” style of education. Fueled by the memories of long lunch lines, fussy, loud children, misspelled words and ignorant bullies, the uptight teacher lets out all of her aggression upon her opponents—and she isn't afraid to utilize her trusty paddle to do it! With WOW Executive Manager Samantha Smart by her side, the other WOW Superheroes had better brush up on their wrestling homework if they ever hope to defeat The Disciplinarian! Manage by Samantha Smart and Tag team partner of Abilene Maverick for the WOW Tag team Championship series.
The Dixie Darlings: Jolene Dixie (Airial Le) and Jolynn Dixie (Cathy Le): The third generation of WOW Superhero the promotion in 2018. Hailing from Virginia, The Dixie Darlings Jolynn and Jolene claim they've been fighters ever since they were “womb-mates”. While pregnant with the twins, their mother was held at gunpoint and shot. The bullet was inches from hitting the two and they were born pre-maturely at six months, spending their first weeks in an incubator. But that didn't stop the infectiously cheerful Jolynn and Jolene from growing up healthy as horses! They gained their tomboy ways from their older brother, who decided he didn't want sisters and raised them like they were his brothers, teaching them to fix cars, shoot guns and scrap. Patriotic and dixie proud, the twins planned to join the Army after high school, but were stopped by their mother, forcing them to find a different path in life. With only $2,000 in their combined pockets, the two well-mannered and strong principled dixie girls made their way all the way to California to join the WOW - Women Of Wrestling training school. There they were discovered by Selina Majors, the WOW trainer (and a southerner herself) who realized the Dixie Darlings had the kind of fire and can-do, positive attitudes missing in the world of pro-wrestling today. Though they sometimes face backlash from people who judge the twins on their looks, the two know who they are in their heart and soul: two proud southern girls who say “yes ma’am” and “yes sir,” who believe in hard work and living off the land, and who just want to have a good time! Will they find their place in WOW, or will they be corrupted by the world of showbiz?
Eye Candy (Willow Nightingale): The third generation of WOW Superhero the promotion in 2018. "THE LIFE OF THE PARTY" Bursting onto the pro-wrestling scene in a halo of sunshine and rainbows, feast your eyes on Eye Candy! Born and raised in The Big Apple, Eye Candy smashes all expectations. Friendly, cheerful and with unmatched energy, she's a whole lotta woman! Radiating confidence, her joy and positive energy is infectious! But it would be a serious mistake to take Eye Candy's big, bubbly personality as a sign of weakness. She's powerful, athletic and dynamic in the ring, combining strength, agility and just a hint of sexy to take down her unsuspecting opponents. With big hair and an even bigger smile, the lovely Eye Candy plans to show the folks at home—and all the other Superheroes of WOW - Women of Wrestling—that you don't have to be mean, rude or negative to get to the top in life. You just have to be yourself, be strong, and win!
Exile: Exodus (Karen Tran), Genesis (Selena O'Sullivan) and Malia Hosaka: The third generation of WOW Superhero the promotion in 2019. "EAGER FOR VENGEANCE" Appearing from nowhere at the conclusion of the WOW Tag Team Championship Tournament to lay out the brand new champions Fire and Adrenaline, Exile revealed that they have arrived at WOW to sow chaos and fear in the name of revenge. Malia Hosaka, Genesis and Exodus each experienced betrayal and mistreatment at the hands of those they trusted. And they are sick of settling for what the world thinks they should look like, talk like or act like. Will this frightening trio send the WOW - Women of Wrestling roster to their knees? Can anyone stand in the way of such a legendary veteran and her two lackeys?.
Faith the Lioness (Faith Jefferies): The third generation of WOW Superhero the promotion in 2018. "WE FLEX" Born to be a Superhero, the aptly named Faith grew up in bright and sunny Southern California, where her hard work and fierce heart gained her the nickname: The Lioness. But it wasn't all sunshine and roses for Faith and her family. Faith is her parents' miracle child, born healthy and whole after a decade of struggle and a difficult health scare. Defying the odds of the original prognosis from doctors, Faith blasted through life in living color, blazing a trail of glory in both the world of music and martial arts—two very unlikely hobbies for a beach blonde bombshell. Faith never strives for anything less than greatness in her life, whether it's earning her black belt in Tae Kwon Do, going on a music tour or stepping into the ring to become the newest WOW Superhero! It was Faith's mother who saw her potential and encouraged her to set her sights on the biggest goal of them all: becoming the WOW - Women of Wrestling champion! Will this fearless young starlet with her big heart achieve her next dream? And she also the Tag team partner of Lana Star for the WOW World Tag team championship series.
Fire (Kiera Hogan): The third generation of WOW Superhero the promotion in 2019. "THE GIRL AFLAME" Like an unquenchable flame, Fire strives for her dreams, letting nothing stand in her way. Born in Atlanta, Georgia, Fire grew up obsessed with becoming a wrestling star. But her parents forbade her from even watching wrestling. So she watched it in secret, even going so far as to trick her parents into thinking she was attending college, but secretly training at a wrestling school instead. It was there that she had the epiphany that led her to become “The Girl Aflame”. Burned alive by the fierceness of training, with a heart aflame she let herself become fully engulfed in her love of wrestling, emerging anew like a phoenix from the ashes. Fire's old life was left in smoke. Baptised with her new name and purpose, Fire entered the WOW - Women of Wrestling roster, where she found a partner in Adrenaline. The two forged a fast friendship that would carry them to the top of the WOW Tag Team Championship tournament - where they faced seemingly unstoppable odds in the form of Havok and Hazard. Shocking the WOW world, Fire and Adrenaline won the day, becoming the new WOW Tag Team Champions. But their victory was short lived, as every other team in the WOW roster seeks to unseat the pair. Will their bond prove unbreakable? And the current WOW World Tag team Championship holder along with Adrenaline.
Fury: (Harlow O’Hara): The third generation of WOW Superhero the promotion in 2018. "DAUGHTER OF DARKNESS" Unable to stay out of trouble for more than five minutes, Fury is a proud rebel from the back alleys of Atlanta, Georgia. As a child, she claims she heard voices calling to her at night. The voices liked to make young Fury do very bad things. Of course, no one around her could accept Fury's tales, and so they just punished her more and more for her misdeeds, until one day Fury decided she'd had enough. She flew into a rage and blacked out. When she woke up, she had no idea where her friends and family had gone. Shaken, she snuck out of her hometown in the middle of the night, never to return. Known to the authorities from the Mississippi to the Pacific Coast, Fury may still be following the dark commands of the voices she claimed to hear. Nothing is too low for her, from bar fights to petty theft. After a particularly brutal street fight in Los Angeles, she was recruited by Razor to join The Psycho Sisters, the most vicious girl gang on the block, with the promise that Razor knows how to make the voices stop. Whether she really can or if it's just a lie to win Fury to her side, together they are the most devastating duo the WOW Superheroes have ever seen. Can anyone stand up to their reign of terror?.
Havok (Jessica Cricks): The third generation of WOW Superhero the promotion in 2018. "MONSTER OF MADNESS" The six foot tall, ungentle giant known as Havok grew up in Ohio, where she quickly earned a name for herself as the human equivalent of a biohazard. Mean, aggressive and not above dirty tricks, she sows mayhem and confusion wherever she goes. Her actions gained her the nickname “The Death Machine” which this madwoman takes as a compliment, beating her foes until they beg for mercy. And she is all out of mercy. Like an unstoppable zombie horde, the crazed Havok tears through her opponents with little regard for the rules of the sport. What brought her to WOW is no secret: Havok has an insatiable need to dominate. She has set her sights on the WOW - Women of Wrestling World Championship and woe is to anyone foolish enough to stand in her way! and one half of Monsters of Madness along with Hazard.
Hazard (Beth Crist): The third generation of WOW Superhero the promotion in 2019. "THE TECHNICAL TERROR" Don't try to stand in her way! Hailing from Ohio, the madwoman Hazard is on a mission: to terrorize anyone who steps into the ring to face her. From a young age Hazard decided she wanted to dedicate her life to smashing the dreams of others. She watched pro wrestling and trained herself, becoming the destructive entity she is today, swiftly decimating her opponents with both her technical prowess and her hard-hitting strikes. The only companion of this ring terror is her friend Jessicka Havok. The two have taken WOW - Women of Wrestling by storm as the seemingly unstoppable team Monsters of Madness. Will anyone stand in their way? Or will the WOW - Women of Wrestling locker room fall one by one? One half of Monsters of Madness along witHavok.
Holidead (Camille Ligon): The second generation of WOW Superhero the promotion in 2016. "FROM THE SHADOWS" Mystery surrounds the tenacious and formidable Holidead. While knowledge of her background is limited, one thing is sure—Holidead is passionate about inflicting pain and destruction upon her adversaries.Despite being a dedicated and loyal follower of Siren the Voodoo Doll, little is known about the apparent control Siren exerts over the enigmatic Holidead. With a penchant for violence and punishment, Holidead is a powerful and hard-hitting opponent. Driven by a desire for Siren's approval, Holidead also relishes in wreaking havoc in the ring and intimidating any opponent she faces at WOW. Characterized by her painted face, and a peculiar twitchiness, her unpredictability has garnered Holidead a reputation for making her opponents uncomfortable. Believing she is misunderstood by society, Holidead does not try to explain who she is and what she wants, but allows her terrifying brand of wrestling to do the talking for her. And one half of the Dark Side along with Siren the Voodoo Doll, with the possessed member Princess Aussie.
Jessie Jones (Jessie Belle McCoy): The second generation of WOW Superhero. THE BARONESS OF "BARDSTOWN" Jessie Jones grew up in the Southern town of Bardstown, Kentucky—the bourbon capital of the world. However, Bardstown was in the shadow of “that yankee city” of Louisville. Jessie was often teased by kids from Louisville for being from Bardstown. The teasing usually led to fighting. The fighting didn't end in the schoolyard and it didn't end well for her attackers. As she grew older and more confident, Jessie would go down to the bars on 4th Street to pick fights with anyone and everyone. Finally, Jessie was sent to live with her family down in Georgia. Part of that family included the legendary Selina Majors. In Georgia, Jessie got to see the best wrestling in her own backyard. She would sit in awe as she heard stories about Selina's career and the stories of Georgia Championship Wrestling. Selina decided to teach Jessie how to wrestle and put that destructive, fighting energy to good use. On the independent circuit, Jessie worked everywhere as she earned her reputation. Now, Selina has brought her family with her to WOW, and these two aims to demonstrate what Southern Pride truly represents. The new Tag team partner of Amber O’Neal formerly known as the Beverly Hills Babe under the managed of Lana Star.
Jungle Grrrl (Erica Porter):  Original WOW Superhero. "THE PREDATOR" As a child, Jungle Grrrl and her parents moved around the world. They settled for a time in Colombia, on the edge of the Amazon Rainforest. Being surrounded by the Amazon's vibrant yet cruel ecosystem taught the young girl the Law of the Jungle: “Kill or be killed.” As an adult, Jungle Grrrl took the lessons she learned in the Amazon and translated them into the ring, becoming one of the fiercest competitors in WOW - Women of Wrestling history As a WOW Superhero; Jungle Grrrl accumulated an impressive winning streak unlike any other competitor. She won the World Championship in 2013 in Las Vegas, Nevada. Outside of the ring, she became a wife, a mother, and a businesswoman. She even became a bestselling author. Maturing changed Jungle Grrrl's mindset. She no longer fought for wins; she began fighting for something more important. As if Jungle Grrrl wasn't already the most feared Superhero in WOW, she now fights for much, much more. She's fighting for her family, her cub, and her dynasty, which makes her all the more dangerous.  And after losing the Championship to Santana Garrett (without being pinned), she must now physically master the hunt once again.
Keta Rush (Keta Meggett): The second generation of WOW Superhero. "FEEL THE RUSH" As a young person, Keta Rush gained a reputation for being an all-around super-athlete. She was a track star who exhibited unparalleled speed. However, her momentum stalled when she became the victim of a tragic act of bullying and intimidation. A group of girls cornered her and beat her mercilessly to within an inch of her life. After a week in the hospital and months of physical therapy, Keta recovered physically, but emotional scars still remain. In her search for recovery, Keta decided to become a Superhero. Keta is determined to ensure no other child has to go through what she experienced. She founded the nonprofit organization, Team Bully Buster; where people of all ages learn confidence, how to identify bullying, what steps to take if they are bullied, and if worse comes to worse, how to defend themselves. WOW - Women of Wrestling has empowered Keta to “be strong, be you, and win”. Now Keta inspires fans of all ages and is making a difference. Listen to her speak or wrestle, you are sure to feel an adrenalin rush! And one half of the Bully Busters along with Stephy Slays formerly had known as Stephanie La Maravillosa.
Khloe Hurtz (Katie Forbes): The second generation of WOW Superhero the promotion in 2016. "THE ALL NATURAL" The comment section is lies Khloe Hurtz is the all-natural, trolls will tell you she's phonier than the catfish, but this is the realest bitch in the game. And don't get it twisted: she is not man-made, she is self-made Khloe got her start in the wrestling business the way she thought she had too—as a just another girl in some guy's entourage, but not anymore. Those tables had turned. Now she has her own crew of muscled bound men at her beck and call. She likes to think of them “ring rats”. Other people label it differently calling the whole concept petty and problematic. But when has khloe ever listened to other people? As far as she's concerned, you're looking at the future face of women's of wrestling. And khloe doesn't give a single dame if you think the face wearing too much make up and shows too much tattooed skin. She's her own greatest creation and if that has any of the other WOW wrestlers shook, well, they're just not woman enough to handle it. When you see the “ring rats” carry her to the ring and removed her sheer white robe, when you see her blow a kiss in the wind to each member of her “rat” squad you know one thing: it's khloe time!.
Krissy Vaine (Kristin Eubanks): The third generation of WOW Superhero the promotion in 2019. The new protege of the fabulous one Lana Star. 
Mezmeriah (Relys Rodriguez): The third generation of WOW Superhero the promotion in 2019. "THE JESTER" Deemed unstable and sent upstate, this New York City native was released from her evaluation after some shady, back-alley negotiations with Razor, the leader of the Psycho Sisters. Mezmeriah thinks that life is one big, cruel joke, and she loves to laugh as she partakes in that cruelty, dealing out pain while crowing maniacally. Her behavior drove a rift between her and her family. She never had any friends. So when Razor showed up and offered her a new family, a new place to belong as a member of the all-girl-gang The Psycho Sisters, Mezmeriah couldn't resist. Now she accompanies Razor everywhere, her wide, hungry grin in constant contrast with the cold anger of Fury. Mezmeriah, Fury and Razor are a force of nature in the WOW - Women of Wrestling ring. Brains, brawn and insanity: Can anyone stand up to this blood-thirsty trio?
Nikki Krampus: The third generation of WOW Superhero the promotion in 2019. "THE NORWEGIAN NIGHTMARE" For every light cast upon this earth, there is a shadow. Nikki Krampus is one such shadow. Born to the screaming winter winds of northern Norway, Nikki Krampus may seem evil, but she is not a villain. She represents a balance to the scales. Where good deeds deserve reward, bad deeds deserve punishment. And Krampus is here from the depths of darkness to bring that punishment. She sees you when you're sleeping. She knows when you're awake. She knows if you've been bad or good. And she's coming to bring retribution. What have the Superheroes of WOW - Women of Wrestling done to deserve a visit from The Norwegian Nightmare, Nikki Krampus? They'll soon find out. Managed by Sophia Lopez.
Princess Aussie (Simone Sherie Williams): The third generation of WOW Superhero the promotion in 2018. "NOT ALL WHO WANDER ARE LOST" Princess Aussie burst into the ring at WOW representing a powerful allegory—that strength is borne of love and togetherness. Princess Aussie's message was shaped by a story her mother told her as a child—that surrounding ourselves with those we love helps us to become who we are meant to be. To represent this message and remind Princess Aussie of her family cheering her on from Australia, the Princess lashed together a bundle of sticks as a symbol. Bringing them ringside, Princess Aussie used the bundle as a reminder that alone, we may be vulnerable, but bound together we are unbreakable. However, the mysterious and powerful, Siren the Voodoo Doll became intrigued by Princess Aussie. She began a strange bid to recruit Aussie to join Holidead as her follower. After being affected by Siren's strange form of mind control, Aussie has become a shadow of her former self, and desiring Siren's twisted approval. It has become clear that Princess Aussie has joined with Siren the Voodoo Doll and Holidead to form a mysterious and powerful team. Will Aussie ever return to her former identity? What is Siren's ultimate goal in recruiting followers who seem to be under the influence of mind control? With associated with Papua New Guinea Warrior and Tag team partner of Reyna Reyes formerly known as Azteca.
Razor (Sarah Rodriguez): The third generation of WOW Superhero the promotion in 2018. "THE VANGUARD OF VIOLENCE" Growing up half-starved on the mean streets of Los Angeles, Razor spent her childhood proving to everyone around her that there's one rule in these dark alleyways: “Don’t &*^% with Razor.” Due to her small size, Razor seemed like an easy target for the scum around her, so she fought twice as hard, using her rage and anger to fuel her street fighting skills. As an adult, she is cold and unfeeling as a dirty back alley knife. Eventually, Razor decided she needed someone to watch her back. She recruited the maniacal Fury to join her new gang: The Psycho Sisters. The Psycho Sisters quickly gained a reputation for being the most vicious girl gang on the block, causing destruction and mayhem wherever they traveled. These mavens of madness have ruled with an iron fist in whichever ring they've stepped into. Setting their sights on WOW, what chaos will these unhinged women unleash?
Reyna Reyes (Gisele Shaw): The third generation of WOW Superhero the promotion in 2018. "THE PEARL OF THE PHILIPPINES" Born to a traditional Filipino family, Reyna Reyes always felt like she let them down with her choice of career: professional wrestling. Begging her to become a nurse or teacher, or any “normal” profession, her family made it clear that they believed Reyna's obsession with defeating her opponents in the squared circle was unacceptable. Not wanting to cause her loved ones pain, Reyna decided to wrestle in secret, creating the persona “Azteca” to hide her trail. She chose Azteca because she fell in love with the pride and respect bestowed upon lucha libre, the Mexican sport of wrestling. No one in Mexico would be ashamed to have a relative partake in such a time-honored tradition, she thought. But while she was Azteca the lessons of lucha libre helped Reyna realize that, in keeping her secret, she was neither honoring nor respecting her own culture and heart. Reyna spent months in agony, searching her soul for a solution, before she finally decided to come out, removing the mask to reveal her true self: Reyna Reyes, The Pearl of the Philippines! Now Reyna is ready to show WOW - Women of Wrestling the lesson she learned from her time as a masked wrestler: only from a pure heart can a radiant warrior shine triumphant. Will she indeed triumph here at WOW? Tag team partner of Princess Aussie.
Santana Garrett: The second generation of WOW Superhero. "HEADBAND POWER" Santana Garrett is a second-generation wrestler. Her father was ‘TNT’ Kenny G, and she grew up ringside since the day she was born. From an early age, Santana knew she wanted to follow in her father's footsteps, even joking that she “grew up inside a wrestling ring.” She has been quoted as saying she learned holds from her dad before she was in junior high. This kind of upbringing had a tremendous influence on the young second-generation star, and as soon as she entered adulthood, she became a wrestler. She earned her stripes throughout the independent circuit of Florida, and began working all over the country, and before long, she went global. She now finds herself in the spotlight on the biggest stage for women's professional wrestling: WOW - Women of Wrestling.  This former WOW Champion abruptly vacated her title to care for her father after the most controversial wrestling match in history between Santana Garret, Jungle Grrrl, and Born Legend Tessa Blanchard. She must now prove herself once again against the most impressive Superheroes in the sport. Former the All American Girls along with Amber O’Neal as the former the WOW World Tag team Championship holder.
The Sassy Massy (Alisha Edwards): The third generation of WOW Superhero the promotion in 2019. "LET’S GET REAL!" Raised by a single mother in Boston, Massachusetts, The Sassy Massy had to fight every day to maintain her positive mind-set and to reach for her goals. Due to her mother's struggle with depression and more, Sassy didn't have a typical childhood. She was raised in the wrong part of town, but refused to give in to the temptations and vices she saw around her. In high school, pro-wrestling became her escape. No matter how bad things got back home, wrestling shows were the place she could go and be herself and forget about her troubles. She was transported into the stories and fates of the characters she watched battle it out week after week. She helped with the shows in any way she could, running concessions and other tasks behind the scenes. It only made sense that Sassy would begin her own wrestling training as soon as she turned eighteen, and she excelled, becoming a positive role-model for other young women as she rose to prominence in the wrestling world. Now The Sassy Massy takes on WOW - Women of Wrestling, pitting herself against some of the greatest women wrestlers in the world to show that a positive mind-set and hard work can lead anyone to the top. Family means the world to this sassy Bostonian and that includes her husband and her children as well as her wrestling family. Will WOW become yet another family for this newcomer, or will she find she has no one to rely on but herself? A Tag team partner of Chantilly Chella.
Serpentine (Melissa Cervantes): The third generation of WOW Superhero the promotion in 2018. "THE EMPRESS OF SNAKES" Claiming to be an ancient queen from a time when reptiles ruled the Earth, no one knows for sure where the mysterious Serpentine came from, but she slithered into the wrestling world like a predator on a mission. Ever one with an eye for talent, Sophia Lopez, the Greatest Attorney in the World, brought the deliciously deadly Serpentine to WOW and has placed her bets on the sinful snake's rise to power—and a belt of glittering gold! Cold-blooded, calculating, smart and lethal, Serpentine brings a unique challenge to the WOW Superheroes, as they face a competitor who is ever-changing and shifting, like a snake shedding its skin. Will the guidance of Sophia Lopez lead Serpentine to a championship? Or will someone put a stop to this venomous viper? Managed by Sophia Lopez and formerly known as Kobra Moon.
Siren "The Voodoo Doll": The third generation of WOW Superhero the promotion in 2018. "THE VOODOO DOLL" There must be a sacrifice! Siren the Voodoo Doll hails from the French Quarter where the practice of voodoo is commonplace. Blood rituals and dark relics laid the foundation upon which Siren's career has stood. She attributes her success to her affiliation with the dark spiritualism that voodoo provides. She has control over her opponents in and out of the ring. Out of the ring, she utilizes the mysticism of the spirit realm to get an edge in the game of life. In the ring, she uses her strength and cunning to gain an edge over the opposition. Her presence itself serves as a mind game to those that dare to step in the ring with Siren. Then, when Siren demonstrates her unique and unorthodox ability in the ring, all challengers remain rattled. Suplexes and shrunken heads. Tapouts and tarot cards. Siren the Voodoo Doll has been able to fuse the surreal qualities of voodoo with a smash-mouth repertoire of incredible maneuvers in the ring. Some may look down upon Siren's religious views. Some may doubt she has the power of the darkness. Those that laugh in her face will soon be silenced by the Siren's song as the Voodoo Doll toys with them. All must make sacrifices, and it appears that the WOW Superheroes will be Siren's offering to the dark from which she has emerged. And one half of the Dark Side along with Holidead, with the possessed member Princess Aussie.
Spike (Ashley Martinez): The second generation of WOW Superhero. "GET TO THE POINT" An original member of the Psycho Sisters, Spike has finally returned to the fold, and just when her sisters need her most. However, despite the gang welcoming Spike back to their ranks—questions have arisen. Where has Spike been? Is she really the same Spike they knew, after all this time? Labeled as a misfit and a troublemaker growing up, Spike was an outcast. It wasn't until she met Razor, that Spike found her place and discovered her true identity. After Spike and Razor joined to form the Psycho Sisters, their rambunctious gang reveled in lawless high jinks—causing mischief wherever they went. Spike's sudden departure from the Psycho Sisters left a hole in the gang, and one not easily filled. In the ring, with her sharp tongue and short fuse, Spike has a reputation for never backing down from a fight. Her years terrorizing the streets of Los Angeles have made Spike a fierce and unpredictable opponent, ready to launch an attack at any moment. Ready to get Psycho?
Stephy Slays (Stephanie Mason): The second generation of WOW Superhero. "THE HUSTLER" You have as many hours in a day as Stephy. She's 22. She's got three jobs, two side hustles, is a full-time college student, and still makes time to bake Pinterest Pizza Bites for movie night with the girls. Plus she's got a Instagram platform that is blowing up. She's up for any challenge whether it's about charity, cinnamon, or winning the WOW World Championship! Ever the master multi-tasker, Stephy's wrestling matches double as both a shot at the title and a wear-test for the best sweat-proof foundations at the drugstore! #NotSponsored. When Stephanie isn't living up to her name by killing it in the ring, she's snapping the latest crazy things Mama Slays says, caring for her fur babies, and exploring all around Los Angeles with her crew. But don't let the filters fool you: this millennial means business! One half of the Bully Busters along with Keta Rush and formerly known as Stepahanie La Maravillosa.
The Temptress (Katarina Leigh Waters): New WOW Superhero the promotion in 2018."BOUDOIR OF RETRIBUTION" Nothing is sexier on a woman than confidence—except, perhaps, bespoke lingerie crafted by The Temptress. Raised in Chelsea, England, The Temptress is a master seamstress who created titillating knickers and cheeky undergarments to help women reclaim their sexiness and find the temptress within them. Unfortunately, when she took her business to the U.S., she was stabbed in the back by greedy investors, and her own creation was stolen away from her. Needing a new way to make a living, the British tart turned to professional wrestling, releasing her anger and thirst for vengeance on her opponents. After a chance meeting outside of Attorney Sophia Lopez's office, The Temptress teamed up with The Dagger to form The Vengeful Vixens tag team. When the other WOW Superheroes meet them in the ring, The Temptress can guarantee one thing: it certainly won't be their cup of tea. Will vengeance lead to success once again for this bereft and betrayed competitor?
Tessa Blanchard: The third generation of WOW Superhero the promotion in 2018. "THE BORN LEGEND" Tessa Blanchard is a professional wrestling superstar and former WOW World Champion with greatness in her veins. The third generation phenomenon comes from a unique lineage. Her grandfather, Joe Blanchard, founded Southwest Championship Wrestling. Her father, Tully Blanchard, is a member of the original Four Horsemen and WWE Hall of Famer. And her stepfather, Magnum TA, is a former NWA United States Champion.  Now she continues her family's legacy while forging her own path at the same time, traveling to countries such as Canada, Mexico, the UK, China, Australia, and Japan. The Born Legend has held championship titles all over the globe and was the first American to win the AAA Reina de Reinas Championship in Mexico. She also currently holds the world record for longest women's single match in history at 75 minutes bell to bell. Tessa's global presence continues to act as an advocate for her ever-growing list of achievements. The seemingly dominant former champion lost the WOW World Championship to The Beast—and will stop at nothing to get it back!. And she under managed of the Greatest Attorney in the World,  Sophia Lopez.
Venomous (Ruby Raze): The third generation of WOW Superhero the promotion in 2019. "THE TOXIC UNDERGROUND".

WOW Tag Teams (season 5–7)

The second generation tag teams. The only tag team that returned to the promotion was The Bully Busters.

The official teams
Adrenaline and Fire
The Bully Busters: Keta Rush and Stephy Slays 
Chantilly Chella and The Sassy Massy
The Darkside: Holidead, Siren the Voodoo Doll and  Princess Aussie 
The Dixie Darlings: Jolene Dixie and Jolynn Dixie and Jessie Jones
The Disciplinarian and Samantha Smart, representative.
Exile: Exodus, Genesis and Malia Hosaka
Monsters of Madness: Jessicka Havok and Hazard
Team Blondage: Amber O'Neal and Krissy Vaine with Lana Star, representative.
The Psycho Sisters: Fury, Mezmeriah, Razor and Spike
The Vengeful Vixens: The Dagger and The Temptress
The former teams.
Abilene Maverick the Governor's Daughter and The Disciplinarian with Samantha Smart, representative.
Amber O’Neal (formerly known as  The Beverly Hills Babe) and Jessie Jones
The Dixie Darlings: Jolene Dixie and Jolynn Dixie
Faith the Lioness and Lana Star, representative
Princess Aussie (with associated the Papua New Guinea Warrior) and Reyna Reyes (formerly known as Azteca)
The unofficial teams.
Amber O’Neal and Faith the Lioness
The Beast and Jungle Grrrl
Cali Ray and Stephy Slays 
Chantilly Chella, Keta Rush and The Sassy Massy
Faith the Lioness and Krissy Vaine with Lana Star, representative.
Faith the Lioness and Reyna Reyes
Krissy Vaine and Lana Star, representative.

WOW Superheroes manager (season 5–7)

The original WOW Superhero is only the former WOW World Champion, Lana Star.

Angelika Dante: The third generation of WOW Superhero the promotion in 2019. "DADDY’S LITTLE ANGEL" With her doll-like eyes, Angelica Dante's innocent looking exterior is almost convincing. But, behind her smile, darkness lurks... Hailing from the cornfields of Kingsland, Texas, Angelica took over as Lady of the House when she was a small girl, following Momma's freak incident with a harvesting scythe. While Angelica was the apple of her daddy's eye, her elder sister made Daddy very upset. Daddy told Angelica that her sister was made wrong, and that she needed to be punished. Despite Daddy's insistence that Angelica's sister remain in the basement, she and Angelica were close—if only in secret. Years passed and while her sister's punishment continued, Angelica had grown into a confident young woman who wanted to see the world. It was a clear, cool night when Angelica stole the basement key from Daddy. After tying up a few loose ends, during which her sister earned her nickname, Chainsaw, she and Angelica began their big adventure to the city. Sweet Angelica likes being in charge. But, there are other girls standing in the way of her becoming Lady of the WOW house—and that makes Angelica upset. And when Angelica gets upset, Chainsaw gets mad, and when Chainsaw gets mad, accidents happen. 
Lana Star (Lana Kinnear): Original WOW Superhero. "THE FABULOUS ONE" Born in the heart of Hollywood, raised on the excess of the Southern California lifestyle and trained to be simply better, the Fabulous Lana Star defines what it means to be Hollywood royalty. Lana craves the spotlight, whether hobnobbing with other celebrities at exclusive restaurants or always sitting front row at any major LA venue: Lana is living the glamorous life. In addition to her successful career in acting and modeling, Lana was also the longest reigning WOW World Champion. Now too good to step in the ring and preferring to let others do her dirty work, Lana manipulated Amber O’Neal into becoming The Beverly Hills Babe, and then discarded her like last season's outfits when Amber wasn't able to bring Lana the championship. Humiliating Amber, she called in her newest protege: the impressionable young Faith the Lioness, who beat Amber in a match to decide who would team with Lana in the tag team tournament! Will trips to Beverly Hills and promises of even more glamorous activities corrupt the always sunny Faith? And will she finally be the one to bring the WOW World Championship back into Lana Star's clutches? And she managed also the Tag team partner of the Lioness for the WOW World Tag team championship series. She newly introduced the another protege Krissy Vaine for the new tag team partner of the Lioness. And after the tag team feud of a past prodigy of Lana Star, The Lioness she get fire as the team, but Amber O'Neal is back as the new member of Team Blondage along with Krissy Vaine.
The Papua New Guinea Warrior: (Tyrone Evans Clark): associated with Princess Aussie.
Samantha Smart (Kirsten Garner): "IQ SUPERIOR" Hailing from a small town in Indiana, Samantha Smart has defied all stereotypes to make it to the top of WOW - Women of Wrestling. Perfection was the only option for this straight-A student who was raised by her studious father, the dean of a college, and her esteemed scientist mother. This bookworm endured her share of taunting for being top of the class, but opinions never fazed her, she lives by facts. Samantha went down an ambitious post-collegiate path that led right to the office of WOW founder David McLane and owner Jeanie Buss. After spending several seasons of running the show and managing the Superheroes, she feels confident she has collected enough wrestling data to step through the ropes herself. With memories of her peers failing to recognize that “your brain can be your weapon”, this superhero is ready to show people how much power she possesses... and that power is only increasing. Finally, this season, Samantha will pursue her newest mission: mastering the art of professional wrestling in the WOW ring. Ms. Smart is well aware that most of the roster has more experience than her, but she also knows that, at the end of the day, her tactics will outsmart them all. Managed of the Disciplinarian and Abilene Maverick. But after they two times lose the tag team matches, Abilene Maverick she gets quit along of them.
Sophia Lopez (Leslie Garza): "THE GREATEST ATTORNEY IN THE WORLD" Sophia Lopez comes from humble beginnings in Mexico, and gained her reputation as “the best attorney in the world” by defending celebrities who got into trouble in Las Vegas. While in the Public Defender's office, she came across the case of Delta Lotta Pain and Loca, known collectively to WOW fans as Caged Heat. The WOW Championship tag team's only escape from their cell was the time they spent in the ring on a work release program. The two always claimed they were wrongly accused, but it seemed they were destined to spend their life rotting in prison. However, Sophia believed in their innocence, and decided to get involved. Her incredibly detailed knowledge of the law and slick legal abilities brought swift justice for the pair, and Caged Heat was soon released from the Nevada Correctional Facility. Not a one-trick pony, Sophia has since shown that her boast of being “The best attorney in the world” just might be true, as her maneuvering also led to Lana Star's ability to name a proxy to wrestle in her place. And Sophia Lopez is just getting started. What will she accomplish next? Managed of Serpentine formerly known as Kobra Moon, Nikki Krampus. And she also managed Tessa Blanchard.
Teal Piper (Ariel Toombs): The third generation of WOW Superhero the promotion in 2019. "LIKE FATHER, LIKE DAUGHTER" Teal Piper is joining the family business. As the daughter of legendary wrestler Rowdy Roddy Piper, wrestling has always been a distinct part of Teal's life. Beginning when she was a little girl, Teal watched her father command the ring and create chaos as the host of ‘Piper’s Pit’—admiring her dad's passion for pro-wrestling she plans to bring the Piper trademark entertainment of a quick wit and proclivity for having fun to wrestling fans worldwide. Fan's will immediately see Teal's penchant for shenanigans bears a striking resemblance to Rowdy Roddy's antics and as fans will soon learn comes second nature to Teal. With a habit of being at the center of misunderstandings, and somehow always followed by mischief, Teal has come to WOW with a plan—to fulfill her family legacy, and get a little rowdy.

List of episodes (season 5) 2018

The series is taped aired on AXS TV and lately streaming aired on the social media account Facebook and YouTube channel.

Below are the results of the matches aired on the WOW TV show and the approximate dates they aired.

List of episodes (season 6) 2019

The series is taped aired on AXS TV and lately streaming aired on the social media account Facebook and YouTube channel.

Below are the results of the matches aired on the WOW TV show and the approximate dates they aired.

List of episodes (season 7) 2019

The series is taped aired on CW Seed and Pluto TV, lately streaming aired on the social media account Facebook and YouTube channel.

Below are the results of the matches aired on the WOW TV show and the approximate dates they aired.

WOW (season 8-current)

WOW Superheroes (2022-2023)

Adriana Gambino (Noelle Giorgi): The third generation of WOW Superhero. Hailing from New Jersey, New York, Adriana Gambino values loyalty above all else. Always dressed to kill, Adriana is careful, calculating and never forgets a face. Evasive when it comes to her family’s business in New Jersey, Adriana maintains that they’re involved in ‘waste management’ but remains ambiguous when it comes to the specifics. Declining to elaborate on her role within the family administration, Adriana instead focuses on her relationship and affection for her father, Don. Following the mysterious disappearance and subsequent grisly discovery of her ex-boyfriend’s body, Adriana arrived at WOW amid accusations of foul play. However, with the murder trial curiously settling out of court, Adriana is forging a new path in the world of wrestling. With a strange knack for poker, blackjack, and a gaze that could cut glass, Adriana comes with a warning– cross her and you may find yourself with a new pair of shoes. A pair you may never be able to remove…
Amber Rodriguez: The fourth generation of WOW superhero the promotion in 2022. Formerly known as Sahara Spars. Reporting for duty, Commander Sahara Spars comes to WOW after bravely taking time to serve her country in the United States Coast Guard. During her tour of duty, Commander Spars exemplified heroism. After noticing that no one in the handbook looked like her, specifically in regards to grooming standards, she spearheaded a diversity and inclusion initiative to ensure the unique needs of people of color were considered. Being of Afro-Latin descent, this initiative was deeply personal for Commander Spars, and was recognized by the Admiral and across the service, leading to permanent reform. After several deployments and starting her own skincare line as a certified esthetician, Commander Spars returns to wrestling. Now that she has tasted victory in her fight for inclusion, she joins WOW to be victorious in the ring. Commander Spars’s battles now take on a special meaning, inspiring her four year old daughter who loves watching her mother kick butt on television.
Americana: The fourth generation of WOW superhero the promotion in 2022. Americana’s earliest inspiration to follow her dreams came from her father, a talented athlete in his own right, whose dreams of MLB success were cut short despite being drafted to the Toronto Blue Jays. Seeing her father’s journey was the foundation for Americana’s desire to follow her dreams and succeed. As a kid growing up in Buffalo, NY, Americana often had to find ways to entertain herself while her parents ran the bar they owned. She took an interest in fitness, and filled her alone-time doing workouts that she created herself. She left home at 19, determined to excel in the world of professional bodybuilding. After earning her pro card, an unexpected career path emerged: professional wrestling. Americana’s journey seemed promising and she progressed quickly, falling in love with wrestling. However, her dreams came to an unexpected halt when she found out she was pregnant. This began the most difficult but rewarding journey of her life: motherhood. As a single mother, Americana had to sacrifice a lot and often struggled to make ends meet. However, after six years away, fate has brought her back to wrestling, and the timing couldn’t be better. As Americana debuts with WOW, her number one fan sits ringside and gets to watch his mother become a WOW superhero.
The Beast (Twana Ferguson): The third generation of WOW Superhero. A provocative word, “Beast” easily conjures thoughts of wild animals, lethality, natural selection, dominance, and even savagery in the minds of many. However, when The Beast steps into the WOW ring, the only thing that comes to mind is unparalleled greatness. Marshawn Lynch is widely credited with popularizing the phrase “Beast Mode” as a shorthand to capture his state of mind while on the football field. It referred to the raw, animalistic persona that one assumes while competing in order to demolish an opponent. The Beast received her name because she is “Beast Mode” personified. This was made abundantly clear even in her first introduction to WOW. The Beast entered the room and said, “I am 200 pounds of walking, talking, romping, stomping, graveyard destruction. I am the OG master of disaster. I will destroy anyone that gets in my path. I am the biggest, I am the baddest, I am the beast…COME GET SOME.” The ring was her territory from then on. The Beast has become one of the most remarkable athletes to step into the WOW ring. She is equal parts mystery and phenomenon. She is The Beast!.
BK Rhythm (Kate Folan): The fourth generation of WOW superhero the promotion in 2022. A fan of professional wrestling as a youngster, this New Orleans-born branded tomboy soon learned the realities of life when she was banned from trying out for her high school wrestling team. Jilted because of her gender, her rage for being discriminated against found an outlet by embracing rap music — the combination of rhythm and poetry spoke to her soul. The driving beat of rap combined with her athleticism led to the birth of BK Rhythm. Following her passion for wrestling, BK Rhythm joined a local wrestling school and began studying the art of Brazilian Jiu-jitsu. Now, armed with superior fighting skills and killer rhymes, BK Rhythm is poised to become a star inside and outside of the WOW ring.
Chainsaw: The third generation of WOW Superhero. Raised in the desert community of Joshua Tree, Chainsaw often felt like the black sheep of her community. She was mercilessly tormented by the other children in school just because of her size. Though she towered over them, she was a gentle soul at heart and just wanted to be accepted. Her only friend and protector was her step-sister, Angelica Dante, who could only do so much to ward off the attacks of their peers. One fateful day, the other children pushed Chainsaw too far and she snapped. The end result was catastrophic. Fed up, Chainsaw’s father locked his problem child away in a dark shed, restraining her with saw chains. With nothing to entertain her but a punching bag and her own thoughts, time passed slowly for Chainsaw, but it was there that she learned to fight. She took out all her frustrations, pain, and tears on the punching bag. Years passed and eventually Angelica took notice of Chainsaw’s superhuman strength; she broke her out, knowing that Chainsaw would dominate in the WOW ring. With this newfound outlet for her rage and the guidance of her sister, Chainsaw is ripping through the WOW competitors one by one.
Chantilly Chella (Rachel Kelvington Bostic): The third generation of WOW Superhero. Get ready, because the beat is about to drop! Chantilly Chella brings the world of Electronic Dance Music to the ring. Her in-ring style mirrors the fluidity and energy that EDM brings to its legions of listeners. Erratic tempo, unpredictable hits, and unrelenting motion are words that describe the hit songs of Zedd, Calvin Harris, and Skrillex, but the WOW Superheroes have used these words to describe Chantilly’s never-before-seen onslaught of ring maneuvers. The Inland Empress stood out as a regular at Coachella, Bonaroo, and South-by-Southwest for years as a chill, laid-back, go-with-the-flow individual with an easy-going attitude. What her fellow festival attendees did not know, however, was that a fiery, heroic combatant lay dormant beneath the surface, waiting to dropkick her way into the WOW ring! Chantilly Chella brings positive vibes to the WOW Superheroes, but once the soundcheck is over… look out, because the beat won’t be the only thing pounding in her opponents’ heads!.
Coach Campanelli: The fourth generation of WOW superhero the promotion in 2022. Coach Campanelli is the best at everything she does. How do we know? Because the Coach said so! Hailing from San Francisco, Coach Campanelli excelled at every sport ever attempted. Softball, soccer, tennis, golf, pickleball, bocce ball, cheese rolling, underwater hockey—you name it, Coach Campanelli played it, and was probably captain of the team! After mastering every sport, she decided to bring her coaching abilities to the WOW Superheroes to teach them how to become true champions. Since arriving at WOW, whether requested or not, Coach Campanelli has inserted her wisdom and coaching acumen. With her red, white, and green tracksuit freshly pressed, laces tied snuggly, and whistle properly polished, Coach Campanelli brings her unsolicited coaching tips to WOW, with a purpose to win…because that’s what Coach Campanelli does.
Crystal Waters: The fourth generation of WOW superhero the promotion in 2022. If you like surf, sand, sunshine, and spring break all the time, then Crystal Waters would totes love to have you over for a day of fun in the sun. A beachy beauty from Sydney, Australia, Crystal Waters knows a thing or two about her name. As a young girl she was raised on Lady Martins Beach, which is known for its gorgeous clear blue water, white sands, and laid back atmosphere. A life in the water gave Crystal the opportunity to indulge in various water activities; She has tried everything from swimming with dolphins to deep sea diving, and is always on the hunt for a new party or adventure. Growing up, she spent so much time in the water that rumor spread she was a mermaid. True or false? She’ll never tell, but if you’re chill and love long walks on the beach, you can hang ten with Crystal any day. She’s just a girl who wants to have fun, and her greatest dream is to make a splash at WOW by inviting as many people as she can to her 24/7 spring break! It’s party time and Crystal Waters is here to shine!.
The Disciplinarian (Robyn Reid): The third generation of WOW Superhero. People like to say that “Kids today lack discipline” but The Disciplinarian knows the truth: EVERYONE nowadays lacks discipline, and she’s here to solve that problem, one paddle at a time! Sent by the South Carolina Board of Education, the strict, southern teacher was hired by Samantha Smart to crack down on the unruly and uncooperative Superheroes of WOW. Some might find it surprising that an educator of young minds participates in such a physical sport, but The Disciplinarian has always believed in a “hands on” style of education. Fueled by the memories of long lunch lines, fussy, loud children, misspelled words and ignorant bullies, the uptight teacher lets out all of her aggression upon her opponents — and she isn’t afraid to utilize her trusty paddle to do it! With WOW Executive Manager Samantha Smart by her side, the other WOW Superheroes had better brush up on their wrestling homework if they ever hope to defeat The Disciplinarian!.
Exile: Exodus (Karen Tran), Genesis (Selena O'Sullivan) and Malia Hosaka: The third generation of WOW Superhero. Appearing from nowhere at the conclusion of the WOW Tag Team Championship Tournament to lay out the brand new champions Fire and Adrenaline, Exile revealed that they have arrived at WOW to sow chaos and fear in the name of revenge. Malia Hosaka, Genesis and Exodus each experienced betrayal and mistreatment at the hands of those they trusted. And they are sick of settling for what the world thinks they should look like, talk like or act like. Will this frightening trio send the WOW – Women Of Wrestling roster to their knees? Can anyone stand in the way of such a legendary veteran and her two lackeys?.
Foxxy Fierce: The fourth generation of WOW superhero the promotion in 2022. Rolling in from the DMV (District of Columbia, Maryland and Virginia), Foxxy Fierce strikes a balance between beauty, tenacity, glamor, and strength. Her fierce fabulousness originates from the generations of unstoppable ancestors who came before her. The people in her family pushed through adversity and insurmountable challenges with poise, grace, and not a hair out of place. Walking through the world as a Black woman, Foxxy Fierce frequently encounters people who expect her to be a “certain way.” She knows what it feels like for her kindness to be perceived as weakness, and her assertiveness to be perceived as aggression. Today, Foxxy Fierce has come to WOW to show the world that she will not be prejudged or boxed in by the perception of others. Her heart is in helping young girls learn to love, embrace, and unify all aspects of themselves. Foxxy Fierce is not one thing. She is a force of strength, beauty, resilience, and full of magnetic energy. It’s time to experience Foxxy Fierce!.
Fury (Harlow O’Hara): The third generation of WOW Superhero. A rebellious troublemaker from the dark alleys of Atlanta, Georgia, Fury doesn’t care what you or anyone else thinks about her. Chaos, disorder, and mayhem are her favorite words and she has made a name for herself in WOW with a peachy sweet smile and a vicious backhand. Fury was the first wrestler that Razor recruited for The Heavy Metal Sisters, sensing a kindred spirit despite their disparate backgrounds. While Razor has the cunning, Fury has the raw strength and power to force her opponents to their knees. Together they become an unstoppable force of nature and nothing can sever their bond of sisterhood.
GI Jane: The fourth generation of WOW superhero the promotion in 2022. Attention! Drill Sergeant, GI Jane is coming at you from Cheverly, MD. Although she now commands any room with ease, things weren’t always so peachy for this tough SGT. As a child, she hadn’t yet found her voice, and because of this was bullied mercilessly at the hands of her peers. However, instead of crumbling, GI Jane resolved herself to become the loudest voice in the room. She adopted an alpha mentality, shaved her head in defiance, and rose above the petty jeers or her peers. After joining the military, she quickly rose in rank due to her hard work and endless dedication. Now positioned at the top, GI Jane is more than happy to guide others towards their own alpha awakening…but sometimes this requires a bit of ‘tough-love’. Though her methods may be rough, GI Jane has joined WOW to show the world that anything is possible when you whip yourself into shape. After all, there’s so much to gain by following GI Jane.
Gigi Gianni: The fourth generation of WOW superhero the promotion in 2022. Strutting in from San Antonio, Texas, Gigi Gianni comes from humble beginnings where family and pride in her Italian heritage were everything; they didn’t have much, but they had each other. Although seemingly proud externally, she was always self-conscious about her athletic build…until she found wrestling. Gigi was instantly inspired by the strong and athletic women who were showcased in the wrestling world. These women of the ring were the catalysts for Gigi’s participation in various athletic endeavors, including dance, and ultimately believing she herself could one day be a star in the wrestling world. After dancing for four years, Gigi was transformed into an entirely new woman with an unbreakable confidence that some might mistake for arrogance. Emboldened, she finally decided to see if her dreams of being a wrestling star could come true. After honing her skills on the independent wrestling circuit, Gigi now steps into the ring with no fear and total confidence that she will become the biggest star in the world’s premier women’s wrestling league – WOW.. With Gigi, nothing’s ever personal, it’s all business. And while Gigi Gianni may exude boss energy now, she has never forgotten her journey from being the little girl that dreamed big. So don’t be fooled by the rocks she’s got, she’s still Gigi from the block.
Glitch "The Gamer" (Alicia Bellamy) : The fourth generation of WOW superhero the promotion in 2022.
Holidead (Camille Ligon): The second generation of WOW Superhero. Mystery surrounds the tenacious and formidable Holidead. While knowledge of her background is limited, one thing is sure– Holidead is passionate about inflicting pain and destruction upon her adversaries. Despite being a dedicated and loyal follower of Siren the Voodoo Doll, little is known about the apparent control Siren exerts over the enigmatic Holidead. With a penchant for violence and punishment, Holidead is a powerful and hard-hitting opponent. Driven by a desire for Siren’s approval, Holidead also relishes in wreaking havoc in the ring and intimidating any opponent she faces at WOW. Characterized by her painted face, and a peculiar twitchiness, her unpredictability has garnered Holidead a reputation for making her opponents uncomfortable. Believing she is misunderstood by society, Holidead does not try to explain who she is and what she wants, but allows her terrifying brand of wrestling to do the talking for her.
Ice Cold: The fourth generation of WOW superhero the promotion in 2022. Hailing from Maine, Ice Cold was born to weather any storm. She is no stranger to subzero temperatures, biting frosts, and ferocious blizzards; in fact, these make her feel alive. As if driven by a nor’easter, Ice Cold swept through the world of athletics, dominating in every sport she tried. She eventually focused her skills on diving and weightlifting, ultimately becoming an NCAA zone A qualifier in diving, and winning multiple regional and national titles in weightlifting. Despite her successes, Ice Cold has not been immune to the harsh storms of life. After the death of her father and brother, as well as a myriad of other trying events, Ice Cold took matters into her own hands. She left home and headed west, showing life itself that she can never be snowed-in. Along her journey, she found herself at the doorstep of WOW, and sticking true to her northern roots, she brought the blizzard with her. Ice Cold joins WOW to prove that life may deliver some bitter blows, but hers are worse. She is constantly growing, learning, and evolving, ready to drag any opponent into her polar vortex and freeze them out. Shiver with fear, Ice Cold is here!
Jennifer "Jen Z" Florez: The fourth generation of WOW superhero the promotion in 2022. Jennifer “Jen Z” Florez is a modern day All-American girl. A first generation Mexican-American, WOW’s youngest superhero reps the inclusive melting pot of Generation Z through trendy streetwear, bold style, and a playful tomboy spirit. With a large social media following, Jen Z is always there for her fans, who identify with her heart and hustle. At 22 years old, Jen Z has worked hard to help financially support her family, put herself through college – recently earning an Associate’s Degree – all while enrolling in professional wrestling school. Jen Z’s wrestling style reflects her diverse background, as the pint-sized dynamite has traveled across America and Mexico to incorporate classic and Luchador techniques into her fighting arsenal. Her fast-paced, high-flying in-ring style and feisty underdog attitude are sure to make Jen Z a WOW fan favorite.
Jessie Jones (Jessie Belle McCoy): The second generation of WOW Superhero. Jessie Jones grew up in the town of Bardstown, Kentucky—the bourbon capital of the world. However, Bardstown was in the shadow of “that yankee city” of Louisville. Jessie was often teased by kids from Louisville for being from Bardstown. The teasing usually led to fighting. The fighting didn’t end in the schoolyard, and it didn’t end well for her attackers. As she grew older and more confident, Jessie would often be seen hanging around a colorful crowd at the bars on 4th Street, where conversations often turned into tussles that ended with Jessie scrapping with the best of them. Not ever taking well to being thought of as less than anyone, it’s no wonder Jessie’s wrestling hero was Georgia Championship Wrestling and later WWE star the son of a plumber: Dusty Rhodes. Today, this no-nonsense, straight-shooting, bourbon-drinking, flag-waving Southerner is seeking to inspire her fellow small town Americans. Her message is that as long as you believe in yourself as much as you believe in America and its great values, you can flourish and win. That’s exactly what Jessie Jones plans to do in this upcoming season of WOW!.
Kandi Krush (Ambery Shaw): The fourth generation of WOW superhero the promotion in 2022. Entering WOW from Minneapolis, Minnesota, Kandi Krush is ready to fight her way to greatness! Don’t let her name fool you, Kandi may have a sweet name, but in the ring, there’s nothing sweet about her! This boxer now wrestler is as relentless and scrappy as they come. In her younger years, Kandi pushed herself to the limit as she endured grueling training to be an Olympic synchronized swimmer. The abusive coaching and over training led her to struggle with depression. Kandi made the impossible decision to leave the sport she loved because she knew she deserved more, but without synchronized swimming, she felt lost. Everything changed when boxing found her. Through professional boxing, Kandi found her inner fighter again. For years, she climbed through the ranks of a male dominated sport and now, Kandi has made her way to WOW to fight for every girl that’s been told they’re not good enough. With the inspiration of her grandmother, Kandi believes that anyone can be a superhero—they just have to look for the greatness within.
Keta Rush (Keta Meggett): The second generation of WOW Superhero. As a young person, Keta Rush gained a reputation for being an all-around super-athlete. She was a trackstar who exhibited unparalleled speed. However, her momentum stalled when she became the victim of a tragic act of bullying and intimidation. A group of girls cornered her and beat her mercilessly to within an inch of her life. After a week in the hospital and months of physical therapy, Keta recovered physically, but emotional scars still remain. In her search for recovery, Keta decided to become a superhero. Keta is determined to ensure no other child has to go through what she experienced. She founded the nonprofit organization,Team Bully Buster, where people of all ages learn confidence, how to identify bullying, what steps to take if they are bullied, and if worse comes to worse, how to defend themselves. WOW – Women Of Wrestling has empowered Keta to “be strong, be yourself, and win”. Now, Keta inspires fans of all ages and is making a difference. Listening to her speak or watching her wrestle, you are sure to feel an adrenalin rush!.
Leia Makoa (Diana Milford-Lemalu): The fourth generation of WOW superhero the promotion in 2022. In her homeland of America Samoa, Leia Makoa’s childhood days were spent climbing the tallest coconut trees and turning the lush island land into her personal playground. When she was 12 years old, Leia’s family came to America in hopes of more opportunity. The reality of America wasn’t as shiny as she thought it would be. Leia was bullied for not having nice clothes and barely speaking English. However, her Samoan spirit wouldn’t let her give up. Everyday, Leia studied the dictionary, becoming fluent in English. Constantly facing adversity due to her immigrant status, Leia turned to sports not only to escape but to thrive. Though her parents didn’t always have the money for her to play, her athleticism was undisputable. In fact, Leia made every team that she tried out for. As an adult, Leia fell in love with professional wrestling and her world changed forever. The Samoan spirit in Leia runs deep and she is ready to climb her way to the top of WOW!.
Mezmeriah (Relys Rodriguez): The third generation of WOW Superhero. This New York City native is no stranger to the strange. Dirty looks and ill-wishes can’t penetrate her terrifyingly cheerful demeanor. But beneath the smiling clown face she sports, Mezmeriah is a woman who has been through heartbreak and betrayal as friends and family could not accept her as she was. Choosing to face life with a smile instead of a frown, Mezmeriah channeled her pain into purpose, ensuring nothing would ever break her spirit again. Although she might seem to think life is one big joke, Mezmeriah is no joke in the ring. Recruited by Razor to join The Heavy Metal Sisters, which has become her new family, she brings a completely chaotic and unpredictable element to the team of cunning Razor and punishing Fury.
Miami's Sweet Heat: Laurie Carlson and Lindsey Carlson: The fourth generation of WOW superhero the promotion in 2022. Lindsey and Laurie Carlson began their journey in small town Nebraska. Growing up as highschool hoop stars, the twins pursued degrees in occupational therapy at the College of St. Mary’s, where both participated on the Flame’s basketball team. Knowing they weren’t good enough to join the WNBA, Lindsey and Laurie decided to take every penny they had saved to escape the bitter cold of the Midwest and traveled south to the Sunshine State of Florida. Armed with master’s degrees in occupational therapy, they stretched their entrepreneurial muscles and opened their own Occupational Therapy Company in Tampa/St. Petersberg. However, dissatisfied with simply succeeding in business, the twins sought out the excitement and energy that college basketball had once provided for them by enrolling in a local wrestling school run by the former WWE stars the Wild Samoans. With their days filled with occupational therapy and nights spent training to become professional wrestlers, the twins reserved their weekends for fun in the magical city of Miami, where they now hail from. Lindsey and Laurie, The Carlson Twins, are Miami's Sweet Heat and they are turning up the temperature at WOW!.
Mother Daughter Truckers: Big Rig Betty and Holly Swag: The fourth generation of WOW superhero the promotion in 2022. Big Rig Betty and her baby girl Holly Swag roll into WOW as the first ever mother and daughter tag team in the league. Big Rig Betty comes from a long line of truckers, including her father and grandfather. Although they were often gone on the long road, whenever her grandfather stopped by, he was sure to take time out to watch pro wrestling with Big Rig. Falling in love with the dream of being a wrestler, Big Rig met Tracy Smothers, who introduced her to the Bardstown brawler Jessie Jones, and they began training. When Big Rig had a daughter of her own, she also began training, continuing the legacy of truck driving while starting a new family legacy of wrestling. The mother trucker and her tow truck driving daughter found themselves on the long haul from Jackson, Tennessee to Los Angeles, California, where they met The Fabulous Lana Star, who gave them tickets to a WOW – Women Of Wrestling show. During the show, they saw a group attacking their old friend Jessie Jones, and jumped in to save her. Seeing their skill and heart, David McLane made their wildest wrestling dreams come true and signed them to the WOW roster. The Tennessee Twosome are trucking straight to the top and with a convoy of fans behind them, there is no roadblock that will stop these two steamrollers!.
Penelope Pink (Marina Tucker): The fourth generation of WOW superhero the promotion in 2022. Penelope Pink may seem prissy and posh, but beneath her barbie doll exterior, she’s always been tough. Born and raised in Detroit, Michigan, both her parents were police officers and held her to very strict standards. However, this didn’t stop Penelope from expressing her glamorous side. Armed with attitude and skill, she excelled in high school, competitive, and all-star cheer. After graduating, Penelope set cheer aside and earned a degree in sports communication, breaking gender barriers during her matriculation by reporting in male dominated environments. As much as Penelope loved journalism, she realized that she would rather be the center of attention, not the person reporting. A long ignored desire to wrestle took hold of her. Although she never thought she had the right look to be a wrestler, she remembered the joy of watching wrestling with her grandfather and brother. Taking a leap of faith, Penelope began wrestling and built a name for herself on the independent circuit. After five long years of being a fabulous wrestler but dealing with the drama and cattiness of others, Penelope Pink decided her talents would be better showcased at WOW. Although she may come across as stuck up, she wants everyone to know it’s just because she’s totally the best.
Princess Aussie (Simone Sherie Williams): The third generation of WOW Superhero. Princess Aussie started her reign in Brisbane, Australia with a childhood full of adventure. The young princess was always on the move, and began working in the entertainment industry as a dancer at only seven years old. By the age of twelve she had traveled across Australia performing a plethora of styles, including her favorite: traditional Balinese dance. During this time, Princess Aussie had to learn to fend for herself, as she and her brother regularly moved in with different families after their mother took a job in Indonesia. At 16, Princess Aussie left home and traveled the world, living in Japan, Singapore, Malaysia, and the Philippines. By the age of 25, she secured a job with a multi-million dollar company, and relocated to the United States. After years of building that company, Princess Aussie needed a change. She remembered a childhood desire to wrestle, switched career paths, and hasn’t looked back. Princess Aussie rules the ring at WOW, and each victory is a testament to her redefinition of the word ‘Princess’. She wants young girls to see that being a princess is so much more than the fairy-tales; it’s being a courageous, strong warrior who can take on the world!.
Randi Rah Rah (Kelsey Hornack): The fourth generation of WOW superhero the promotion in 2022. Tumbling in from the ‘Sunshine State’, Randi Rah Rah is here to P-U-M-P pump it up! Growing up in Tampa, Florida, surrounded by cities that host some of the biggest cheer competitions, Randi Rah Rah took a liking to the sport early on. However, her path to cheerleading was different than you might expect. Her first love was gymnastics, and she competed throughout high school. After graduating, her athletic background allowed her to seamlessly transition into cheer. Randi Rah Rah secured a cheerleading scholarship at a D1 university and then went on to cheer professionally for the NBA, NFL, and NHL. Her passion and skill in cheerleading led her to wrestling. Mirroring her leap from gymnastics to cheer, her path to wrestling started later than most, but was aided by her athletic prowess. She found that wrestling allowed her to use all her skill sets while still challenging her to learn something new. Now that she joins WOW, Randi Rah Rah is determined to show others that it’s never too late to chase your dreams and pursue something new. Randi has cheered for others her entire career, and now it’s time to cheer for her! With a V-I-C-T-O-R-Y, Randi Rah Rah will soar high!.
Razor (Sarah Rodriguez): The third generation of WOW Superhero. Growing up half-starved on the mean streets of Los Angeles, Razor spent her childhood proving to everyone around her that there’s one rule in these dim alleyways: “Don’t &*^% with Razor.” Due to her small size, Razor seemed like an easy target for the scum around her, so she fought twice as hard, using her rage and anger to fuel her street fighting skills and build her vicious cunning. If you see Razor smiling: it’s already too late. Eventually, Razor decided she needed someone to watch her back, so she created the Heavy Metal Sisters, a gang that has become more of a sisterhood. United in their differences and love for chaos, their goal is to dominate their opponents in the ring with their brutal brawling style!.
Reina Del Rey (Ruby Raze): The third generation of WOW Superhero. Raised by a family of fighters, Reina Del Rey has been tough since birth. At her father’s behest, she was thrown into boxing matches with her cousins at a young age; this is where she learned to defend herself and her loved ones. Her family placed equal emphasis on fighting for what you hold dear and maintaining loyalty to those who fight for you. Reina Del Rey took this to heart, and as she grew older frequently defended hers on the streets of LA, eventually becoming hired muscle. This is what led her to the Chola lifestyle. Graffiti, tattoos, and custom lowriders are just a few aspects of the often misunderstood Chola tradition that speak to Reina Del Rey. Chola culture has allowed her to find greater creative expression, and she is proud to exemplify the behavioral and stylistic constitution of the tradition. Reina Del Rey has found WOW to be the perfect arena to showcase and uplift her Chola heritage. She is rolling into WOW in her custom late model lowrider, complete with elegant upholstery, hydraulic suspension, and a gold-plated undercarriage; all while bouncing to the beat of her own drum. Formerly known as Venomous in the seventh season.
Robbie Rocket: The fourth generation of WOW superhero the promotion in 2022. 3…2…1… blastoff, Robbie Rocket has careened onto the WOW world stage at full blast, with no signs of slowing. A true self starter, and much like her namesake, Robbie Rocket got to where she is without the help of her environment. Like a rocket, she was able to ignite despite her atmosphere and found the power to soar within herself. Growing up homeless on the streets of San Gabriel Valley and parts of Arizona, Robbie was an unwilling nomad. Her challenging upbringing was made worse by the people surrounding her. When she was looking for support, she never found it in the hoard of liars, abusers, and leeches lurking around every corner, waiting to prey on the innocent and weak. Thus, Robbie Rocket had to wise up early and grow strong. Using her street smarts, unwavering resolve, and talent for wrestling, Robbie took off at full speed and never looked back. At WOW, Robbie Rocket would rather inspire by showing than telling. She might seem a bit coarse and rough around the edges, but Robbie hopes that her challenges and triumphs will inspire others like her to find the rocket power within. But a word of caution to her competition…If you step in the ring, stand back and prepare for take off because Robbie’s ready to Rocket.
Sandy Shore (Madisyn Spognola): The fourth generation of WOW superhero the promotion in 2022. If you love sunshine, good times and the beach, then you’ve got a ton in common with surfin’ Sandy Shore! Born and raised in Myrtle Beach, South Carolina, Sandy grew up a fan of the positivity and fun of the beach lifestyle. She met her best friend, Cali Ray, when she vacationed at Myrtle Beach, and Cali convinced Sandy to try the west coast waves next. Sandy fell in love with the beaches of California, and it wasn’t long before she and Cali made tons of great new friends, including the Australian partyer Crystal Waters. The friends promised each other that if they ever needed help, they would be by each other’s side. Here Spring Break never ends, it’s Spring Break 24/7, and Sandy Shore plans to show WOW that just because she loves to have fun, she’s all business when she steps into the wrestling ring!.
Siren "The Voodoo Doll": The third generation of WOW Superhero. There must be a sacrifice! Siren the Voodoo Doll hails from the French Quarter where the practice of voodoo is commonplace. Blood rituals and dark relics laid the foundation upon which Siren’s career has stood. She attributes her success to her affiliation with the dark spiritualism that voodoo provides. She has control over her opponents in and out of the ring. Out of the ring, she utilizes the mysticism of the spirit realm to get an edge in the game of life. In the ring, she uses her strength and cunning to gain an edge over the opposition. Her presence itself serves as a mind game to those that dare to step in the ring with Siren. Then, when Siren demonstrates her unique and unorthodox ability in the ring, all challengers remain rattled. Suplexes and shrunken heads. Tapouts and tarot cards. Siren the Voodoo Doll has been able to fuse the surreal qualities of voodoo with a smash-mouth repertoire of incredible maneuvers in the ring. Some may look down upon Siren’s religious views. Some may doubt she has the power of the darkness. Those that laugh in her face will soon be silenced by the Siren’s song as the Voodoo Doll toys with them. All must make sacrifices, and it appears that the WOW Superheroes will be Siren’s offering to the dark from which she has emerged.
Stephy Slays (Stephanie Mason): The second generation of WOW Superhero. Stephy Slays has been bursting into the WOW ring, radiating positivity since the age of 17, but her journey to get there wasn’t easy. Born and raised in Dallas, Texas, Stephy struggled from an early age due to her father’s mistreatment, and eventual absence by the time she was 12. Initially, Stephy felt relief because she and her mother could finally live in peace; however, she was promptly disillusioned. Instead of being mistreated by her father, she was now being mistreated by her classmates. Their bullying was relentless; they made fun of everything from her clothes to her home life. This went unchecked for years until one day they followed Stephy home and attacked her. Finally the school intervened, but by then Stephy was deeply affected and fell into depression. On the road to healing, Stephy’s therapist recommended that she find an athletic outlet. With the help of family friend Sophia Lopez, Stephy began her WOW journey. After taking time off to pursue a medical degree, Stephy Slays returns to WOW, brighter than ever. Today, she fights with renewed vigor to show everyone that no matter how dark life can be, keep pushing, because a glimpse of light will always shine through.
Sylvia Sanchez: The fourth generation of WOW superhero the promotion in 2022.
Tiki Chamorro (Billionna Reyes): The fourth generation of WOW superhero the promotion in 2022.  It was on the small island of Guam that Tiki Chamorro’s taste for adventure and spirit of fearlessness were born. As a young girl, she spent her days in hot pursuit of the next quest. From hours in the water cliff jumping, to late night crab hunting, to celebrating village fiestas, Tiki Chamorro developed her tough skin and a deep love for her community. It was also on the Island that she began playing Rugby and further developed her natural athleticism. Armed with a sense of strength, loyalty, and love, Tiki Chamorro left for the mainland in order to pursue a different lifestyle and become an advocate for her people. 
The Tonga Twins: Kaoz (Steffanie Manukainiu) and Kona (Ashley Manukainiu): The fourth generation of WOW superhero the promotion in 2022. Erupting over WOW like an active volcano, Kaoz and Kona are The Tonga Twins. Descended from Tongan royalty and born to immigrant parents, Kaoz and Kona are second generation Tongans from Vallejo, California. Their path to adulthood wasn’t easy, as they had to harden themselves early on due to rampant gang violence in their neighborhood. Despite this environment, they found solace in each other and basketball. The Tonga Twins started playing basketball at the age of six, and by high school they had a reputation for being the biggest and baddest on the court. However, they soon found their basketball careers in flux as the pressures of life overtook them. Shortly after high school, Kona stopped playing to raise her son and Kaoz went on to play college basketball, but eventually left to raise her twins. After a long hiatus, The Tonga Twins yearned to reunite and dominate in sports once again. They noticed the lack of representation for Tongan women in wrestling, and became inspired to make a difference. After training with hall of famer Rikishi, and making waves on the independent wrestling scene, The Tonga Twins are ready to dominate WOW, and represent for Tongan women and girls all over.
Tormenta (Cristina Ramirez): The fourth generation of WOW superhero the promotion in 2022. At the age of 19 in Guadalajara, Mexico, Tormenta hit the mat to provide a living for her son and family. Her journey into the world of wrestling took her to the capital of lucha: Mexico City, where opportunities in the ring don’t come easily. She passed out flyers, set up chairs, worked security, trained non-stop, went hungry, and sold everything to provide for her family while following her dream. It still wasn’t enough. She returned home defeated. Tormenta tried to put wrestling out of her mind, but she couldn’t put it out of her heart. With a strong belief in her faith that all things work together for good, Tormenta was soon asked to join the largest wrestling promotion in all of Mexico, AAA, as one of its famed luchadoras. For 15 years, she dominated the Mexican landscape, holding her second dream of becoming a star in America close to her heart. Having met the world’s greatest attorney, WOW’s Sophia Lopez, who has proven to be an expert in immigration law, Tormenta comes to America with high hopes and a realization that dreams can come true and an affirmation in her belief that all things work together for good.
Vickie Lynn McCoy: The fourth generation of WOW superhero the promotion in 2022. From the oil fields of Tulsa, Oklahoma to the bar room floor of her own tonky honk, this voluptuous blonde was her grandaddy’s little angel. But this rebel and heartbreaker made her own rules to live by. After her rich, oil typhoon grandfather passed away, Vickie Lynn inherited the ranch and bought herself her own playground: Tulsa’s elite cowboy bar — where bull riding, bar fighting and pro wrestling meet. And overseeing it all is Vickie Lynn, the modern day Dolly Parton, with big hair, big presence and big personality. When curvaceous Vickie Lynn is in the room: all eyes are on her. That’s what drew Lana Star, who recruited the lovely Vickie to her new elite faction, alongside Penelope Pink and Miami’s Sweet Heat. Together they are Lana Star’s Fabulous Four.
Vivian Rivera: The fourth generation of WOW superhero the promotion in 2022. Vivian Rivera was raised in the streets of South LA, where stories of inequality and violence are more common than success. As a Salvadoran from the wrong side of town, she was frequently told that she would never go anywhere in life. Vivian found refuge in wrestling and her hero, Eddie Guerrero. Watching Eddie helped Vivian learn it would take incredible honesty, accountability, courage, and resilience to fight the challenges and demons within herself. Struggling for years with depression and thoughts of self-harm, Vivian quickly realized that the systems in place were not on her side. She soon developed a strong desire to heal—not just for herself, but for her community. Vivian didn’t want to succumb to her circumstances and battles, but rise despite them. She earned her master’s degree and became a social worker to serve the people she loves. Through it all, she still loved wrestling. Today, Vivian Rivera has come to WOW as a beacon of hope for all the girls who have ever felt like they didn’t have a chance.
Wrecking Ball: The fourth generation of WOW superhero the promotion in 2022.

WOW Tag Teams (season 8-current)
 
The only tag team that returned to the promotion was The Bully Busters, The Dark Side, Exile and The Heavy Metal Sisters formerly known as The Psycho Sisters.

The official teams
Amber Rodriguez (formerly known as Sahara Spars) and Gigi Gianni
Americana and Jessie Jones
BK Rhythm and Robbie Rocket
Chantilly Chella and Foxxy Fierce
Coach Campanelli and Randi Rah Rah
Crystal Waters and Sandy Shore
The Darkside: Chainsaw, Holidead and Siren the Voodoo Doll with Angelika Dante, representative.
The Disciplinarian and GI Jane with Samantha Smart, representative.
Exile: Exodus and Genesis with Malia Hosaka, representative.
The Fabulous 4: Penelope Pink, Vickie Lynn McCoy and Miami's Sweet Heat: Laurie Carlson and Lindsey Carlson with Lana Star, representative.
The Heavy Metal Sisters: Fury, Mezmeriah and Razor, formely known as The Psycho Sisters.
Jennifer Florez and Keta Rush
Leia Makoa and Tiki Chamorro
The Mother Truckers: Big Rig Betty and Holly Swag
The Tonga Twins: Kaoz and Kona
Tormenta and Wrecking Ball with the Atty. Sophia Lopez, representative.
The former teams
Adriana Gambino and Gigi Gianni
BK Rhythm and Glitch the Gamer
The Bully Busters: Keta Rush and Stephy Slays
Chantilly Chella and Randi Rah Rah
The Disciplinarian, GI Jane and Ice Cold with Samantha Smart, representative.
The Disciplinarian and Ice Cold with Samantha Smart, representative.
The Disciplinarian and Jessie Jones with Samantha Smart, representative.
Miami's Sweet Heat: Laurie Carlson and Lindsey Carlson
Princess Aussie and Tiki Chamorro
The unofficial teams
Americana, Jessie Jones and Sahara Spars (later Amber Rodriguez)
Big Rig Betty, Holly Swag and Jessie Jones
BK Rhythm and Jessie Jones
Chantilly Chella, Coach Campanelli and Randi Rah Rah
Chantilly Chella, Foxxy Fierce and Kandi Krush
Foxxy Fierce and Ice Cold
Foxxy Fierce and Tiki Chamorro
Kandi Krush and Keta Rush
Kaoz, Kona and Tiki Chamorro
Keta Rush, Stephy Slays and Vivian Rivera
Leia Makoa and Princess Aussie
Stephy Slays and Vivian Rivera

WOW Superheroes manager (season 8-current)
 

Angelika Dante: The third generation of WOW Superhero the promotion in 2019. "DADDY’S LITTLE ANGEL" With her doll-like eyes, Angelica Dante's innocent looking exterior is almost convincing. But, behind her smile, darkness lurks... Hailing from the cornfields of Kingsland, Texas, Angelica took over as Lady of the House when she was a small girl, following Momma's freak incident with a harvesting scythe. While Angelica was the apple of her daddy's eye, her elder sister made Daddy very upset. Daddy told Angelica that her sister was made wrong, and that she needed to be punished. Despite Daddy's insistence that Angelica's sister remain in the basement, she and Angelica were close—if only in secret. Years passed and while her sister's punishment continued, Angelica had grown into a confident young woman who wanted to see the world. It was a clear, cool night when Angelica stole the basement key from Daddy. After tying up a few loose ends, during which her sister earned her nickname, Chainsaw, she and Angelica began their big adventure to the city. Sweet Angelica likes being in charge. But, there are other girls standing in the way of her becoming Lady of the WOW house—and that makes Angelica upset. And when Angelica gets upset, Chainsaw gets mad, and when Chainsaw gets mad, accidents happen. 
Lana Star (Lana Kinnear): Original WOW Superhero. Born in the heart of Hollywood, raised in the SoCal lifestyle of excess, and trained to be simply better, the Fabulous Lana Star is a paragon of Hollywood royalty. Lana craves the spotlight; whether hobnobbing with other celebrities at exclusive restaurants or sitting front row at any major LA venue, Lana is living the glamorous life. In addition to her successful career in acting and modeling, Lana held the title of longest reigning WOW World Champion. Now too good to step in the ring and preferring to let others do her dirty work, Lana has manipulated numerous wrestlers into fighting her battles, only to discard them like last season’s outfits when they weren’t able to bring her the championship. Most recently, Lana has found a new protege in the young Penelope Pink. After a few trips to Beverly Hills and promises of a luxurious lifestyle, Penelope was easily convinced to join forces…but will she finally be the one to bring the WOW World Championship back into Lana Star’s clutches?. And with her the Fabulous Four, Penelope Pink, Vickie Lynn McCoy and the WOW World Tag Team Champions, Miami Sweet Heat (Laurie Carlson and Lindsey Carlson).
Samantha Smart (Kirsten Garner): The third generation of WOW Superhero. Hailing from a small town in Indiana, Samantha Smart has defied all stereotypes to make it to the top of WOW – Women Of Wrestling. Perfection was the only option for this straight-A student who was raised by her studious father, the dean of a college, and her esteemed scientist mother. This bookworm endured her share of taunting for being top of the class, but opinions never phased her, she lives by facts. Samantha went down an ambitious post-collegiate path that led right to the office of WOW founder David McLane and owner Jeanie Buss. After spending several seasons of running the show and managing the Superheroes, she feels confident she has collected enough wrestling data to step through the ropes herself. With memories of her peers failing to recognize that “your brain can be your weapon”, this superhero is ready to show people how much power she possesses… and that power is only increasing. Finally, this season, Samantha will pursue her newest mission: mastering the art of professional wrestling in the WOW ring. Ms. Smart is well aware that most of the roster has more experience than her, but she also knows that, at the end of the day, her tactics will outsmart them all.
Sophia Lopez (Leslie Garza): Sophia Lopez comes from humble beginnings in Mexico, and gained her reputation as “the best attorney in the world” by defending celebrities who got into trouble in Las Vegas. While in the Public Defender’s office, she came across the case of Delta Lotta Pain and Loca, known collectively to WOW fans as Caged Heat. The WOW Championship tag team’s only escape from their cell was the time they spent in the ring on a work release program. The two always claimed they were wrongly accused, but it seemed they were destined to spend their life rotting in prison. However, Sophia believed in their innocence, and decided to get involved. Her incredibly detailed knowledge of the law and slick legal abilities brought swift justice for the pair, and Caged Heat was soon released from the Nevada Correctional Facility. Not a one-trick pony, Sophia has since shown that her boast of being “The best attorney in the world” just might be true, as her maneuvering also led to Lana Star’s ability to name a proxy to wrestle in her place. And Sophia Lopez is just getting started. What will she accomplish next?.

List of episodes (season 8) 2022-2023

The series is taped aired on Broadcast syndication, CW Seed and Pluto TV lately streaming aired on the social media account Facebook and YouTube channel.

Below are the results of the matches aired on the WOW TV show and the approximate dates they aired.

List of episodes (season 9) 2023

The series is taped aired on Broadcast syndication and Pluto TV lately streaming aired on the social media account Facebook and YouTube channel.

Below are the results of the matches aired on the WOW TV show and the approximate dates they aired.

See also

List of women's wrestling promotions

References

Women's professional wrestling promotions